= Caritas Syria =

Syrian Catholic charitable and humanitarian aid organisation

- Caritas Syria
- كاريتاس سوريا
- Established: 1954; 72 years ago
- Purpose: humanitarian, development, advocacy
- Location: Damascus, Syria
- Region served: Syria
- Official language: Arabic, English
- President: Jean-Abdo Arbach
- Affiliations: Caritas Internationalis, Caritas Middle East and North Africa
- Website: www.caritas-sy.org
- Formerly called: Commission commune de bienfaisance

Caritas Syria (Arabic: كاريتاس سوريا, French: Caritas Syrie) is a Syrian Catholic charitable and humanitarian aid organisation.

It is a member of the global Caritas Internationalis confederation and of the regional Caritas Middle East and North Africa.

== History and work ==
Caritas Syria was founded by the Council of the heads of the Catholic Churches in Syria in 1954, at the time of the Syrian Republic. It was previously known by the French name Commission commune de bienfaisance ('Joint Charity Commission'). For a long time, the level of activities of the organisation was relatively limited and localised. In the 1990s, Caritas Syria provided aid to the many Iraqi refugees arriving in the country in the aftermath of the Gulf War. Similar support was given following the invasion of Iraq in 2003 and during the Iraqi civil war (2006–2008).

With the start of the Syrian civil war in 2011, Caritas Syria significantly scaled up its work across the country, quickly becoming an important humanitarian actor. The organisation provided relief in the form of food and basic items and was active in the sectors of education, support for the elderly, psycho-social support for children, housing assistance, and repairs of houses damaged by the fighting.

In 2015, Caritas provided support to over 205,000 persons in Syria. This support included distributing food and other essential items for everyday use, such as clothes, dishes, blankets, and cleaning agents. Additionally, Caritas offered assistance with rent payments and medical needs, along with education for children and help for the elderly. In general, Caritas Syria provides assistance both in the form of in-kind distributions and of Cash and Voucher Assistance.

A Caritas employee was killed during a bombing of Aleppo in April 2015; a Caritas volunteer died during another bombing the following year.

After the 2023 Turkey–Syria earthquakes, Caritas Syria also mobilised quickly its network of staff and volunteers to provide help through 71 centres in the most affected area, notably Aleppo and Latakia. They distributed thousands of food packages and hygiene kits and more than 10,000 blankets. Caritas Syria also contributed to the reconstruction of 20 schools and 330 individual shelters.

Despite being a Catholic organisation, Caritas Syria serves all persons independently of their religious or political affiliations. The organisation works with various religious communities and cooperates with Shiite and Sunnite humanitarian organisations. Caritas Syria's work has been funded by UN agencies such as UNHCR and other member organisations of the Caritas Internationalis confederation.

Caritas Switzerland also maintains a country office in Damascus and cooperates with Caritas Syria.

== Presidents ==
- 2001–?: Youssef Absi
- 2010–2018: Antoine Audo, Chaldean Eparchs of Aleppo
- Currently: Jean-Abdo Arbach, archeparch of the Melkite Greek Catholic Archeparchy of Homs, Hama and Yabroud
