= Ignace Raad =

Melkite Greek Catholic archbishop

- Archeparch of Sidon
- Native name: اجناس رعد
- Church: Melkite Greek Catholic Church
- Archdiocese: Archeparchy of Sidon
- In office: 9 September 1981 – 18 September 1985
- Predecessor: Michel Hakim
- Successor: Georges Kwaïter

Orders
- Ordination: 9 November 1947
- Consecration: 30 October 1981 by Maximos V Hakim

Personal details
- Born: 20 December 1923 Kfar Nabrakh, mandatory State of Greater Lebanon, French Empire
- Died: 19 July 1999 (aged 75) Montreal, Quebec, Canada

Ignace Raad, BS (20 December 1923 in Kafar-Nabrakh, Lebanon – 19 July 1999, Montreal, Quebec, Canada) was Archbishop of the Melkite Greek Catholic Archeparchy of Sidon in Lebanon and judge at the Tribunal of the Roman Rota.

== Life ==
At the age of 11, Raad entered the monastery of the Melkite Basilian of the Most Holy Redeemer in Joun. In 1945 he laid his Eternal vow and prepared himself to become a monk. In 1947, his predecessor, Bishop Basile Khoury, BS, of Sidon, consecrated him deacon and the Patriarch of Antioch Maximos IV Sayegh ordained him on 9 November 1947, to the priesthood and he became Chaplain of the Melkite Basilian. Raad then taught for two years at the seminary of the Basilian and received his PhD in 1949 in Rome for Doctor of Political Science and Doctor of the Church - and civil law.

From 1953 to 1972 he was pastor of the parish "Immaculate Conception of Heliopolis" in Cairo. During this time, he became Archimandrite and was consecrated in other functions in the Archdiocese of Alexandria at the Melkite University as Professor of Religion, Chief Justice of the Patriarchal Appeals and Deputy Patriarchal Vicar of Alexandria.

Raad moved in 1972 to Rome and was assigned duties in the Vatican. Until 1981, he was a judge at the Tribunal of the Roman Rota. The Melkite Synod elected him on 9 September 1981 for the Archeparchy of Sidon. On 30 October 1981, Ignace Raad was consecrated bishop by Melkite Patriarch Maximos V Hakim and his co-consecrators were Archbishop Nicolas Hajj, SDS, and Archbishop François Abou Mokh, BS. On 18 September 1985, he quit his position back at the Synod of the Melkite Greek Catholic Church and took over the Presidency of the Church Court of the Melkite Church in Canada, based in Montreal after leaving his office as Archeparch of Sidon. His successor in 1987 was Archbishop Georges Kwaïter, elected to the office. Until his death on 19 July 1999, Raad remained as emeritus Archbishop of Sidon and was buried on 23 July 1999 in Montreal.
