= Youhanna Fouad El-Hage =

Lebanese Maronite Archeparch

Youhanna Fouad El-Hage (born 13 March 1939 in Zahle, Lebanon - died on 4 May 2005) was a Lebanese Archeparch of the Maronite Catholic Archeparchy of Tripoli in Lebanon, and served as President of both Caritas Internationalis and Caritas Lebanon.

== Life ==
On March 17, 1968, El-Hage was ordained priest. He studied in Rome, in the United States and in Beirut. On 7 June 1997, El-Hage was appointed Maronite Archbishop of Tripoli in Northern Lebanon. His episcopal consecration took place on 1 November 1997 by the hands of the Maronite Patriarch of Antioch, Cardinal Nasrallah Boutros Sfeir, and his co-consecrators were Roland Aboujaoudé, Titular bishop of Antioch and Georges Scandar, Eparch of Zahleh.

In Lebanon, he was known as "bishop of the poor" by Christians and Muslims.

El-Hage died on May 4, 2005.

== Other activities ==
- President of Caritas Lebanon since 1991.
- President of Caritas MONA (Middle East / North Africa).
- President of the worldwide Caritas network (Caritas Internationalis) from 1999 to 2005, which consists of 162 national Caritas organizations.
