= SMSP =

SMSP may refer to:

- Saint Michael's School of Padada, school in the Philippines
- Società dei Missionari di San Paolo, Eastern Catholic religious order including Pierre Kamel Medawar
- Missionary Society of St Paul (also known in Latin as Societas Missionarium Sancti Pauli), Melkite Greek Catholic society of apolistic life
- Société minière du sud Pacifique, a business in New Caledonia involved in the Koniambo mine
