= François Abou Mokh =

Syrian bishop (born 1921)

François Abou Mokh, BS (1 July 1921 in Ma'loula, Syria – 11 August 2006) was a Curial Bishop in the Melkite Patriarchate of Antioch in Syria.

== Ecclesiastical biography ==
François Abou Mokh was ordained to the priesthood on 12 July 1946 and became Chaplain of the Melkite Basilica of the Most Holy Redeemer. From 1972 to 1978 he worked as procurator of the Melkite Patriarch of Antioch in Rome. With simultaneous appointment as Titular Archbishop of Palmyra of Greek Melkites he was on 7 February 1978 appointed bishop in the Melkite Patriarchate of Antioch. The Patriarch of Antioch Archbishop Maximos V Hakim and the archbishops Nicolas Hajj, SDS and Saba Youakim, BS consecrated him on 17 March 1978 to the episcopate. In addition to office he was from 1978 to 1984 and again from 1992 to 1995 Patriarchal Vicar of Damascus. On 27 July 1998, he retired by reasons of age after be appointed Bishop of the Curia in the Patriarchate of Antioch in 1997. From 1997 to 1998 he was also Protosyncellus for the Melkite Archdiocese of Damascus. Until his death on 11 August 2006, he was a retired active Curial Bishop of Antioch. Archbishop Abou Mokh assisted as co-consecrator at the following bishops:

- 1981 - Michel Yatim, Archbishop of Latakia in Syria
- 1981 - Ignace Raad, Archbishop of Sidon in Lebanon
- 1981 - Gregory III Laham, BS Titular Archbishop of Tarsus of Greek Melkites and later Patriarch of Antioch
- 1987 - Georges Kwaïter, BS, Archbishop of Sidon
- 1990 - Ignatius Ghattas, BS, Bishop of Newton in the USA
- 1992 - Isidore Battikha, BA, titular bishop of Pelusium dei Greco-Melkiti (Auxiliary Bishop of Damascus)
- 1995 - Jean-Clément Jeanbart, Archbishop of Aleppo in Syria
- 1996 - Issam John Darwich, BS, Bishop of Sydney in Australia
- 2003 - Ibrahim Ibrahim, Bishop of Montreal in Canada

== Works ==
- François Abou Mokh, Les Confessions d'un Arabe catholique, Centurion, 1991, (in French), ISBN 2227320443.
