= Denys Gaith =

Denys Gaith BC
- Archeparch of Homs
- Church: Melkite Greek Catholic Church
- Archdiocese: Archeparchy of Homs
- In office: 19 August 1971 – 22 March 1986
- Predecessor: Jean Bassoul
- Successor: Abraham Nehmé

Orders
- Ordination: 8 September 1937
- Consecration: 12 September 1971 by Maximos V Hakim

Personal details
- Born: 19 March 1910 Yabroud, Damascus Sanjak, Syria Vilayet, Ottoman Empire
- Died: 22 March 1986 (aged 76)

Denys Gaith, BC (19 March 1910 in Yabroud, Syria – 22 March 1986) was Archbishop of the Melkite Greek Catholic Archeparchy of Homs in Syria.

== Life ==
Denys Gaith was ordained on 8 September 1937 and became the Chaplain of the Saint John the Baptist Basilians. The Assembly of Bishops of the Melkite Greek Catholic Church elected him on 19 August 1971 as successor of Jean Bassoul as Archbishop of Homs. Melkite Patriarch Maximos V Hakim was his consecrator and his co-consecrators were Archbishop Athanase Oh-Chaer, BC and Archbishop Nicolas Hajj, SDS on 12 September 1971. Gaith held office until his death, when he was succeeded by Abraham Nehmé.
