= Georges Nicholas Haddad =

Lebanese bishop (born 1957)

Georges Nicholas Haddad SMSP
- Archeparch of Baniyas
- Native name: جورج نيكولاس حداد
- Church: Melkite Greek Catholic Church
- Archdiocese: Archeparchy of Baniyas
- Appointed: 14 October 2006
- Predecessor: Antoine Hayek
- Previous posts: Apostolic Administrator of Akka (2003-2006); Titular Eparch of Myra dei Greco-Melkiti (2002-2006); Apostolic Exarch of Argentine (2002-2005)

Orders
- Ordination: 28 August 1983 by Maximos V Hakim
- Consecration: 23 June 2002 by Gregory III Laham

Personal details
- Born: 24 June 1957 (age 69) Beirut, Lebanon

Georges Nicolas Haddad, SMSP (born 24 June 1957 in Beirut, Lebanon) is the current bishop of the Melkite Greek Catholic Archeparchy of Baniyas, Lebanon.

== Ecclesiastical career ==
Haddad was ordained a priest on 28 August 1983 as a member of the Melkite religious community SMSP.

On 20 April 2002, he was appointed as Titular Archbishop of Myra of Greek Melkites with simultaneous appointment as Apostolic Exarch of Argentina. His episcopal ordination was performed on 23 June 2002 by Gregory III Laham BS, Melkite Patriarch of Antioch, and his co-consecrators were André Haddad, BS (Archbishop of Zahle and Furzol) and Georges El-Murr, BC (Archbishop of Petra and Philadelphia).

On 21 March 2003 Haddad was appointed Apostolic Administrator of Akka in Israel. On 19 December 2005 he resigned as Bishop of Argentina, and on 7 February 2006 followed the resignation as Apostolic Administrator of Akka. His appointment as Archbishop of Banyas was held on 17 October 2006.

In October 2010, Haddad participated in the Special Assembly of the Synod of Bishops in Rome. The Synod of Bishops treated the situation of the Eastern Churches in the Middle East, and the archbishop participated in an intervention. He criticized the unsatisfactory implementation of religious freedom in Lebanon and on the basis that the constitution of 1926. Lebanese constitution proclaims a great religious freedom, which will not realize the full extent. Haddad called in his statement the deepening of inter-religious dialogue and requested of all religious communities in Lebanon to cooperate.
