= Elie Bechara Haddad =

Lebanese Melkite Greek Catholic archbishop (born 1960)

The Most Reverend Elie Bechara Haddad BS
- Archbishop of Sidon
- Church: Melkite Greek Catholic Church
- Archdiocese: Sidon and Deir el-Qamar
- Appointed: 27 January 2007
- Predecessor: Georges Kwaiter
- Other post: Apostolic Administrator of the Archeparchy of Tyre (2021–2022)

Orders
- Ordination: 9 July 1986
- Consecration: 24 March 2007 by Gregory III Laham, Georges Kwaiter and Joseph Kallas

Personal details
- Born: Elie Bechara Haddad; 28 January 1960 (age 66) Ablah, Lebanon
- Residence: Sidon, Lebanon
- Education: Pontifical Lateran University

Elie Bechara Haddad, BS (born 28 January 1960) is a Lebanese hierarch of the Melkite Greek Catholic Church who has been the Archeparch of the Melkite Greek Catholic Archeparchy of Sidon since 2007.

== Biography ==
Elie Bechara Haddad was born on 28 January 1960 in Ablah, Lebanon, under the Beqaa Governorate. He made his religious vows in the Basilian Salvatorian Order on 3 September 1983. After the subsequent formation of priests, he was on 9 July 1986 ordained to the priesthood.

After his ordination he studied Civil Law in Rome and received his PhD in 1994 at the Pontifical Lateran University in Canon law. He was Chairman of the Appellate court in the Melkite Greek Catholic Church. In 1995 Haddad was elected consecrated Archimandrite and office manager of the Patriarchal office in Raboué. In 1990 he was appointed chaplain of the "Movement of Apostolate of Children (IMAC)" in Lebanon. From 1990 to 2001 Haddad was secretary of his order and directed the Seminary of the Basilians. From 2001 to 2006 he taught canon law at the Saint Joseph University in Beirut, the Holy Spirit University of Kaslik, the Sagessa University in Beirut and in the Saint Paul Institute of Theology and Philosophy in Harissa.

The Synod of the Melkite bishops elected him on 11 October 2006 to succeed Georges Kwaïter as Archbishop of Sidon. On 27 January 2007 Pope Benedict XVI confirmed his appointment. Haddad was consecrated by Melkite Patriarch of Antioch Gregory III Laham. The co-consecrators were Georges Kwaïter and Joseph Kallas of Beirut and Byblos.

On 31 January 2021, Pope Francis appointed him apostolic administrator of the Melkite Greek Catholic Archeparchy of Tyre.

== Views ==
Haddad participated in the Special Assembly of the Synod of Bishops on the Middle East that met in Rome in October 2010. He decried the emigration of Christians from Lebanon and their land sales that demonstrate they do not intend to return. He said the Eastern Churches connected to Rome need to demonstrate mutual solidarity to prevent Christianity from disappearing. He called for the Church to distinguish clearly between Islam on the whole and certain fundamentalist movements within Islam. He asked for "a more sustainable form of support for the Oriental Churches" on the part of Rome that would recognize its role in economic development to tie Christians to their ancestral localities and create jobs.
