= Issam John Darwich =

Issam John Darwich BS
- Archeparch Emeritus of Zahle and Forzol
- Native name: عصام يوحنا درويش
- Archdiocese: Melkite Greek Catholic Archeparchy of Zahle and Forzol
- In office: 15 June 2011 – 26 June 2021
- Predecessor: André Haddad
- Successor: Ibrahim Ibrahim
- Previous post: Eparch of Saint Michael Archangel in Sydney (1996-2011)

Orders
- Ordination: 17 September 1972 by Saba Youakim
- Consecration: 11 May 1996 by Maximos V Hakim

Personal details
- Born: 4 May 1945 (age 81) Damascus, Mandatory Syrian Republic

Issam John Darwich, BS, (born 4 May 1945, Damascus, Syria) was Archbishop of the Melkite Greek Catholic Archeparchy of Zahle and Forzol in Lebanon from 2011 to 2021.

== Life and education ==
Issam Darwich, whose his baptismal name is John, was born in Damascus as the son of Hanna Khoury Darwich and his wife Naayem Mayaleh. From 1965 to 1972 he attended the college of the Holy Savior near Sidon (South Lebanon) and closed at the Holy Spirit University of Kaslik with a Bachelor of Philosophy and Theology. In 1971 he was ordained a deacon and received on 17 September 1971, the ordination as a priest of the Melkite religious community "Ordo Basilianus Sanctissimi Salvatoris Melkitarum" (Order code: BS) by Archbishop Saba Youakim of Petra and Philadelphia (Jordan).

== Life in Lebanon ==
After ordination, he taught from 1972 to 1976 at the School of the Holy Redeemer. He became chaplain and Almoner of the "International Apostolic Movement for Children" (IMAC) in 1972. From 1976 to 1978 Darwich was director of an orphanage in Sidon and established several training centers for adults since 1977. In 1978, he was the rain colleague of the Holy Savior in Jounieh and became head of the seminary and lay training. In 1983 Darwich was appointed director of the "Friendship Home" in Zahle. Founded in 1983, he built the St. Joseph High School in El Houch Omara. Between 1985 - 1996 Darwich founded in Forzul, Zahle and West Bekaa several education and care services for young people, children and adults.

From 1990 to 1996 he was assessor in the Chapter of the Basilian Salvatorian, in 1990 he was elected as the representative of Lebanon to the International Bureau for Children. In 1995 Darwich was elected to the International Committee for Adult Education in France and was appointed vicar general of the Basilian. It was donated by the Lebanese president Elias Hrawi to him in 1989, a gold medal for his services to education.

== Eparch of Australia and New Zealand ==
The Synod of the Melkite Greek Catholic Church chose Issam John Darwich bishop of the Melkite Christians living in Australia. On August 4, 1995, he received the papal appointment as bishop of the Melkite Greek Catholic Eparchy of Saint Michael Archangel in Sydney. The episcopal ordination was donated on 11 May 1995 by the Patriarch of Antioch Maximos V Hakim. As co-consecrators assisted Archbishop François Abou Mokh, Titular Archbishop of Palmyra of Greek Melkites and Auxiliary Bishop of Antioch, and the Archbishop André Haddad, BS of Zahle and Furzol. The official inauguration was celebrated on June 2, 1996, Darwich was now the "Eparch of St. Michael Archangel of Melkite Greek Catholics in the Australia and New Zealand." The words "and New Zealand" took place only in 1999, after Pope John Paul II had also given responsibility for New Zealand. As early as 1997 Darwich was elected General Secretary of the Episcopal Conference. In 2003, Darwich called the foundation of the "Australian Christian-Muslim community" in life, he was following the tradition of the Melkite bishops for Interfaith dialogue. Also in 2003, he became a member of the "Episcopal Commission for Ecumenism and interreligious Relations" of the Australian Bishops' Conference, and in 2009 his mandate was extended. He stepped up since 2000 the public relations of the Melkite Church in Australia and New Zealand, and in 2005 founded the first magazine. In 2009 was approved and published the Statute of the Eparchy of St. Michael of Sydney for Melkite Greek Catholics in Australia and New Zealand. He was co consecrator of the Bishop Sleiman Hajjar, BS, eparch of the Melkite Greek Catholic Eparchy of Saint-Sauveur in Montréal in Canada.

As a participant in the Special Assembly of the Synod of Bishops (Catholic) in Rome which took place in October 2010 whose theme was "Christians in the Middle East," he treated intervened with the final report. In three sections Darwich first led to the excellent cooperation of the Christian churches in Australia and New Zealand, which come from Egypt, Sudan and Syria. He pointed out that inter-religious dialogue between Muslim and Christian communities show good results. Darwich then turned to the situation in the Middle East and stated that he had detected a large intolerance among the Eastern Catholic Churches, especially the clergy and the church administration, in the Middle East. He recalled the words of Pope Benedict XIV, denominated as:"The Church of Jesus Christ is not Latin nor Greek nor Slav, but Catholic." Darwich regretted that these words would not be understood by all clergy in the Middle East as another critical remark based on the lack of communication, among the Eastern Catholic Churches, that is superficial, run very little cooperation and is directed to the own advantages. Ultimately, Darwich spoke about the role of the laity, they would have more to fraternal coexistence with other religious communities being prepared to do it.

== Archbishop ==
The Synod of the Melkite Greek Catholic Church chose Issam John Darwich on 25 June 2010 as Archbishop of Zahle and Furzol. Pope Benedict XVI confirmed him on 15 June 2011, his election as archbishop, and Darwich could be introduced formally in office on 14 August 2011.

== Works ==
- 2007 Arabic: "وجه المسيح - رؤية من الشرق" (English: "The face of Christ - A Vision of the East")
- 2007 "A Bridge for the unit", the Melkite Greek Catholic Church in Australia.
- 2009 "A Journey with St. Paul."
- 2010 "The priest! Identity and mission." (in Lebanon)
