= Nicolas Hajj =

Nicolas Hajj BS
- Archeparch of Baniyas
- Native name: نقولا الحاج
- Church: Melkite Greek Catholic Church
- Archdiocese: Archeparchy of Baniyas
- In office: 3 November 1984 – 18 September 1985
- Predecessor: Athanase Ach-Chaer
- Successor: Antoine Hayek
- Previous posts: Titular Archeparch of Damiata dei Greco-Melkiti (1965-1984); Auxiliary (Arch)Eparchy of Antioch (1965-1984)

Orders
- Ordination: 1 April 1934
- Consecration: 5 September 1965 by Maximos IV Sayegh

Personal details
- Born: 30 June 1907 Machghara, Damascus Sanjak, Syria vilayet, Ottoman Empire
- Died: 12 January 1995 (aged 87)

Nicolas Hajj, BS (born on 30 June 1907 in Machgara, Lebanon - died on 12 January 1995) was a Melkite Greek Catholic Archbishop of the Melkite Greek Catholic Archeparchy of Baniyas.

== Life ==
Nicolas Hajj was ordained to the priesthood on April 1, 1934, as Chaplain of the Melkite Basilian of the Most Holy Redeemer Order. On 30 July 1965, he was appointed as archbishop and his ordination was performed per hac vice and became Auxiliary Bishop in the Melkite Patriarchate of Antioch and titular Archbishop of Damietta of Greek Melkites. On September 9, 1965, he was consecrated bishop by Patriarch of Antioch Maximos IV Sayegh, SMSP consecrated bishop. His co-consecrators were the archbishops Pierre Kamel Medawar, SMSP and Néophytos Edelby, BA.

On November 3, 1984, Nicolas Hajj was appointed Archbishop of Banyas in Lebanon. For age-related reasons, he resigned his office on September 18, 1985, and became emeritus archbishop until his death on January 12, 1995. From 14 September to 8 December 1965 he was a participant at the fourth session of the Second Vatican Council. Archbishop Hajj was co-consecrator of the Archbishops Saba Youakim, BS, Denys Gaith, BC, François Abou Mokh, BS, Jean Mansour, SMSP, Ignace Raad and André Haddad, BS.
