= Melkite Greek Catholic Archeparchy of Baniyas =

Eastern Catholic archeparchy in Lebanon

Archeparchy of Baniyas (Melkite Greek) Archeparchy Caesariensis or Paneadensis

Location
- Country: Lebanon
- Coordinates: 33°21′43″N 35°35′23″E

Statistics
- Population: (as of 2012); 2,500
- Parishes: 11

Information
- Denomination: Melkite Greek Catholic Church
- Rite: Byzantine Rite
- Established: 1886

Current leadership
- Pope: Leo XIV
- Patriarch: Youssef Absi
- Archeparch: Georges Nicholas Haddad

Melkite Greek Catholic Archeparchy of Baniyas (in Latin: Archeparchy Caesariensis or Paneadensis) is a diocese of the Melkite Greek Catholic Church suffragan of the Melkite Greek Catholic Archeparchy of Tyre. In 2009 there were 2,500 baptized. It is currently governed by Archeparch Georges Nicholas Haddad, SMSP. The Archeparchy is named after the city of Baniyas in the Golan Heights at the foot of Mount Hermon.

== Territory and statistics ==
The archeparchy includes the southeastern part of Lebanon. The archeparchial seat is the town of Marjayoun with its Saint Peter's Cathedral, built in 1892 and restored in 1968 after a fire. The archeparchy had 11 parishes at the end of 2012.

== History ==
The ancient seat dates from the fourth century, and it was restored as an eparchy on February 25, 1886. On November 18, 1964, it was elevated to the rank of archeparchy.

== Bishops ==
- Basile Finan (1724–1752)
- Maximos Sallal El Fakhoury (1759–1768)
- Headquarters suppressed (1768–1886)
- Barakat Geraigiry (February 22, 1886 – March 24, 1898 confirmed the Patriarch of Antioch of the Melkites)
- Clemente Malouf, B.S. (November 24, 1901 – 1941 deceased)
- Isidore Fattal (June 20, 1943 – August 13, 1943 appointed Archbishop of Aleppo)
- Basilio Antonio Leone Kilzi, B. A. (July 10, 1944 – August 11, 1951 resigned)

== Archbishops ==
- Athanase Ach-Chaer, B.C. (July 28, 1951 – November 2, 1984 withdrawn)
- Nicolas Hajj, S.D.S. (November 3, 1984 – September 18, 1985 resigned)
- Habib Bacha (1985–1987) (Patriarchal Administrator)
- Joseph Raya (1987–1989) (Patriarchal Administrator)
- Antoine Hayek, B.C. (July 19, 1989 – October 17, 2006 withdrawn)
- Georges Nicholas Haddad, SMSP, (since October 17, 2006)

== Sources ==
- Annuario Pontificio, Libreria Editrice Vaticana, Città del Vaticano, 2003, ISBN 88-209-7422-3.
