= Jean Bassoul =

Jean Bassoul BS
- Archeparch of Zahle and Forzol
- Native name: جان بسول
- Church: Melkite Greek Catholic Church
- Archdiocese: Melkite Greek Catholic Archeparchy of Zahle and Forzol
- In office: 21 August 1971 – 9 August 1977
- Predecessor: Eftimios Youakim
- Successor: Augustin Farah
- Previous post: Archeparch of Homs (1962-1971)

Orders
- Ordination: 11 July 1943
- Consecration: 28 April 1962 by Basile Khoury

Personal details
- Born: 7 May 1920 Maghdouché, OETA West
- Died: 9 August 1977 (aged 57)

Jean Bassoul, BS, also John Bassoul, (7 May 1920 in Maghdouché, Lebanon – 9 August 1977) was an archbishop of the Melkite Greek Catholic Archeparchy of Zahle and Forzol.

== Ordination ==
On 11 July 1943 Bassoul was ordained priest and was appointed Chaplain of the Melkite Basilian Salvatorian Order.

== Chaplain in the US ==
In 1960 he became Archimandrite of the Melkite parish of Roslindale in Boston, Massachusetts. The parish is part of the Melkite Greek Catholic Eparchy of Newton and is also the seat of the bishop of the Melkite Christians in the United States. In his short tenure as pastor he was instrumental in the planning for the construction of the "Annunciation Melkite Catholic Cathedral" in Roslindale. After the consecration of a bishop in 1962, John Elya, BS, assumed the parish.

== Archbishop ==
The appointment as Archbishop of Homs in Syria took place on December 5, 1961. On April 28, 1962, he was consecrated bishop in Boston by Cardinal Richard Cushing, the Roman Catholic Archbishop of Boston. From 1962 to 1971 Bassoul headed the Melkite Greek Catholic Archeparchy of Homs.

From 21 August 1971 until his death on August 9, 1977 Bassoul became archbishop of Zahle and Forzol in Lebanon. In this office he was succeeded by Augustin Farah. Archbishop Bassoul was from 1962 to 1965 participant in all sessions of the Second Vatican Council. Bassoul was co-consecrator of the Archbishop of Beirut and Byblos, Habib Bacha.
