= Georges Kwaïter =

Georges Kwaïter B.S.
- Archeparch of Sidon
- Native name: جورج كويتر
- Church: Melkite Greek Catholic Church
- Archdiocese: Archeparchy of Sidon
- In office: 23 July 1987 – 9 October 2006
- Predecessor: Ignace Raad
- Successor: Elie Bechara Haddad

Orders
- Ordination: 13 June 1954
- Consecration: 23 October 1987 by Maximos V Hakim

Personal details
- Born: 28 April 1928 Damascus, mandatory State of Syria, French Empire
- Died: 26 July 2011 (aged 83)

Georges Kwaïter (born 28 April 1928 in Damascus – died 26 July 2011) was an Archeparch of the Melkite Greek Catholic Archeparchy of Sidon.

== Life ==
On 15 July 1951 Georges Kwaïter made his perpetual vows in his Congregation of the Most Holy Redeemer of Melkite Basilians and on 13 June 1954 was ordained to the priesthood became himself Chaplain of the Basilians. On 23 July 1987, he was elected by the Melkite Synod of Bishops as Archbishop of Sidon and the successor to Archbishop Ignace Raad. He was confirmed by Pope John Paul II. The Patriarch of Antioch Maximos V Hakim gave him on 23 October 1987 his episcopal ordination. As co-consecrators assisted him Titular Archbishop of Tarsus of Greek Melkites Gregory Laham (Archbishop "pro hac vice", Auxiliary Bishop in Jerusalem and later Patriarch of Antioch) and the Archbishop François Abou Mokh, BS.

Georges Kwaïter was co-consecrator of Salim Ghazal, BS and his eventual successor Elie Bechara Haddad, BS. In 2006, his age-appropriate retirement request was accepted by the Melkite Synod.
