= Melkite Greek Catholic Archeparchy of Sidon =

Eastern Catholic archeparchy in Lebanon

Coordinates: 33.5667°N 35.3667°E

Archeparchy of Sidon (Melkite Greek) Archieparchia Sidoniensis Graecorum Melkitarum

Location
- Country: Lebanon

Statistics
- Population: (as of 2010); 32,000
- Parishes: 53

Information
- Denomination: Melkite Greek Catholic Church
- Rite: Byzantine Rite
- Established: 1964
- Cathedral: Saint Nicholas Cathedral

Current leadership
- Pope: Leo XIV
- Patriarch: Youssef Absi
- Archeparch: Elie Bechara Haddad

Melkite Greek Catholic Archeparchy of Sidon (Latin: Archeparchia Sidoniensis Graecorum Melkitarum) is a diocese of the Melkite Greek Catholic Church suffragan of the Melkite Greek Catholic Archeparchy of Tyre. It is governed by Archeparch Elie Bechara Haddad. The territory is made up of 53 parishes and, as of 2010, 32,000 Melkite Catholics.

== Territory ==
The archeparchy's jurisdiction covers the Melkite Greek population of Sidon District and Chouf District in Lebanon. Its archeparchial seat is the city of Sidon, at the cathedral of Saint Nicholas.

== History ==
Sidon was the site of an ancient Christian community, dating to its earliest days. The Christian origins of Sidon date to the New Testament, in the Gospel of Matthew (Matthew 15: 21–28)—"From there, Jesus withdrew to the region of Tyre and Sidon"—and the Gospel of Mark (Mark 7, 31)—"Jesus left the region of Tyre, and came through Sidon to the Sea of Galilee midst of the coasts of Decapolis." On the arrest and imprisonment of Paul, in the Acts of the Apostles (Acts 27.3), "The next day we touched at Sidon, and Julius treated Paul the benevolent, allowed him to go to his friends and to seek care." However, the presence of a bishop is historically first attested at the First Council of Nicaea of 325.

The community was first documented in 770.

With the conquest of the last Crusader bastion in Acre by the Mamelukes in 1291, the Christian community in Sidon largely vanished. The reconstruction of the Christian communities in and around Sidon began again in 1604 with the election of Ignatius Houtiyeh as bishop of Tyre and Sidon.

Thereafter some Melkite Orthodox priests converted to the Roman Catholic Church. They united ecclesiastically with the Roman Church under the administration of Euthymius II Karmah, Melkite Patriarch of Antioch.

The Eparchy of Sidon started in 1683 with its Melkite bishops in communion with Rome.

Initially it was united with the archeparchy of Tyre; the two locations were separated in the mid-eighteenth century (approximately 1752). Tyre became an archeparchy and Sidon an eparchy.

On 18 November 1964 the eparchy was elevated to the rank of archeparchy by Pope Paul VI.

On 27 January 2007, the pope gave his assent to Elie Haddad's election, canonically made by the Synod of the Melkite Greek Catholic Church on 11 October 2006, to Archbishop of Sidon to the Melkites.

== Bishops ==
- Euthymios Michael Saifi (1683 - October 8, 1723 deceased)
- Ignatius El Beyrouthy (1724 - 1752 resigned)
- Basilios Jelghaf (1755 - July 23, 1764 appointed prefect of Beirut)
- Michel Jawhar, BS (1764 - March 30, 1789 confirmed Melkite Patriarch of Antioch)
- Vacant (1789-1795)
- Agapius II Matar, BS (1795 - July 24, 1797 confirmed Melkite Patriarch of Antioch)
- Gabriel Matar, BS (1800 - August 14, 1813 elected Melkite Patriarch of Antioch)
- Vacant (1813-1822)
- Helias (Basilios) Khalil (2 February 1822 consecrated - 1836 deceased)
- Theodosius Kuyumji (20 December 1836 consecrated - 1886 deceased)
- Basil Haggiar, BS (June 16, 1887 - February 16, 1916 deceased)
- Athanasius Khoriaty, BS (March 14, 1920 - January 24, 1931 deceased)
- Gabriel (Nicholas) Nabaa, BS (November 22, 1931 - December 15, 1946 deceased)

=== Archbishops ===
- Basile Khoury (March 15, 1947 - August 25, 1977 withdrawn)
- Michel Hakim, BS (August 25, 1977 - October 13, 1980 appointed Apostolic Exarch of Canada)
- Ignace Raad (9 September 1981 – 18 September 1985)
- Georges Kwaïter, BS (23 July 1987 – 2006)
- Elie Bechara Haddad, BS (11 October 2006 –)
