= Abraham Nehmé =

Syrian archbishop (1927–2022)

Abraham Nehmé BC
- Archeparch of Homs
- Church: Melkite Greek Catholic Church
- Archdiocese: Archeparchy of Homs
- In office: 20 August 1986 – 20 June 2005
- Predecessor: Denys Gaith
- Successor: Isidore Battikha

Orders
- Ordination: 3 January 1954
- Consecration: 26 October 1986 by Maximos V Hakim

Personal details
- Born: 8 October 1927 Qaitouli, Mandatory Lebanese Republic, French Empire
- Died: 9 December 2022 (aged 95)

Abraham Nehmé, BC or Ibrahim Naameh (8 October 1927 – 9 December 2022) was Archbishop of the Melkite Greek Catholic Archeparchy of Homs in Syria.

== Life ==
Nehmé was born in Kaïtouly, Lebanon on 8 October 1927.

Nehmé was ordained to the priesthood on 3 January 1954 and became Chaplain of the Saint John the Baptist Basilians of St. John consecrated. The Bishops' Conference of the Melkite Greek Catholic Church appointed him on 20 August 1986 successor of Denys Gaith as Archbishop of Homs. The Patriarch of Antioch Maximos V Hakim ordained him bishop on 26 October 1986.

As co-consecrators assisted the Patriarch Hakim the Archbishops Habib Bacha, SMSP and André Haddad, BS. During his tenure Nehmé was co-consecrator of the archbishops Antoine Hayek, BC, Georges El-Murr, BC and Bishop Jean-Abdo Arbach, BC. In 2006 Archbishop Nehmé after his retirement became emeritus archbishop, and was succeeded by Isidore Battikha.

Nehmé died on 9 December 2022, at the age of 95.

== About married priests ==
In 2001 Nehmé declared in an interview, "that the priests had four to nine children in his diocese on average and therefore were not less zealous in its missionary and apostolic work than their unmarried brothers". In another line of thought, he raises the question of whether the "success could not inspire the West with the married Catholic priests in the Orient?" And he gives an answer to this question: "But this development will not proceed stormy, may we have waiting for a third Vatican Council."
