= Eftimios Youakim =

Archbishop of Melkite Greek Catholic Archeparchy of Zahle

Eftimios Youakim BS
- Archeparch of Zahle and Forzol
- Native name: افتيميوس يواكيم
- Church: Melkite Greek Catholic Church
- Archdiocese: Melkite Greek Catholic Archeparchy of Zahle and Forzol
- In office: 9 December 1926 – 21 August 1971
- Predecessor: Daher Moghabghab
- Successor: Jean Bassoul
- Other post: Titular Archbishop of Scythopolis (1971-1972)

Orders
- Ordination: 12 March 1912
- Consecration: 9 December 1926 by Cyril IX Moghabghab

Personal details
- Born: 15 June 1886
- Died: 19 May 1972 (aged 85)

Eftimios Youakim, BS, (15 June 1886 in Qaytuleh – 19 May 1972) was an archbishop of the Melkite Greek Catholic Archeparchy of Zahle and Forzol in Lebanon.

== Life ==
On 25 March 1912 Youakim was ordained priest and appointed chaplain of the Melkite Basilians of the Most Holy Redeemer. The appointment as bishop of Zahle and Fourzol took place on October 30, 1926. The Patriarch of Antioch Cyril IX Moghabghab consecrated him bishop on 9 December 1926. With the elevation of the bishopric of Zahle and Fourzol in 1964 to Archdiocese Youakim was appointed archbishop. After his age-appropriate retirement on 21 August 1971, he was appointed Titular Archbishop of Scythospolis. Youakim participated from 1962 to 1965 in all sessions of the Second Vatican Council. He was co-consecrator of Archbishop Saba Youakim, BS, of Petra and Philadelphia in Jordan. He was succeeded by Archbishop Jean Bassoul, BS.

== See also ==
- Catholic Church in Lebanon
