= Jean-Abdo Arbach =

Syrian Melkite Catholic archbishop (born 1952)

The Most Reverend Jean-Abdo Arbach B.C.
- Archbishop of Homs
- Church: Greek Melkite Catholic Church
- Archdiocese: Homs
- See: Homs
- Appointed: 23 June 2012
- Predecessor: Isidore Battikha
- Previous posts: Titular Bishop of Hilta (2006); Apostolic Exarch of Argentina of the Greek-Melkites (2006-12); Titular Bishop of Palmyra (2006-12)

Orders
- Ordination: 24 August 1980 by Habib Bacha
- Consecration: 3 February 2007 by Grégoire III Laham

Personal details
- Born: Jean-Abdo Arbach; 28 June 1952 (age 73) Yabroud, Syria

Jean-Abdo Arbach, B.C., (born on June 28, 1952, in Yabroud, Syria) is the current archeparch of the Melkite Greek Catholic Archeparchy of Homs, Hama and Yabroud.

== Life ==
In 1966 Jean-Abdo Arbach began his studies at the seminary and lived in the adjoining monastery. In 1977, he put in the Melkite congregation of Basilian Salvatorian Order, and took his religious vows. On 2 December 1979, Arbach was ordained a deacon and received on 24 August 1980, the ordination to the priesthood in the Basilian order. The consecration was performed by the Archbishop of Beirut and Byblos Habib Bacha. From 1980 to 1986 he was Director and Professor of Arabic at the seminary. Arbach joined a number of positions at seminaries and within the religious community. He was staying at the Holy Spirit University of Kaslik and earned a degree in liturgy and Arabic. Arbach was head of the Episcopal seminary of Zahle and Furzol and studied psychology at the National University in Lebanon. From 1997 to 2004 he was pastor of San George Church in Cordoba, Argentina, and director of the Basilian Order. In 2004 Arbach went back and was in the diocese of Zahle and Furzol rector of the Oriental College, where he taught Arabic, French and Spanish. He led retreats, taught the catechism and published articles in various journals.

== Exarch ==
On 17 October 2006, he became the exarch of Argentina, titular bishop of Hilta, and also became titular bishop of the Roman Catholic Church, appointed by Pope Benedict XVI, with simultaneous appointment. His appointed asTitular Bishop of Palmyra of Greek Melkites was decreed on 11 November 2006. On February 3, 2007, Arbach was ordained bishop by the Patriarch Gregory III Laham, BS and his co-consecrators were Abraham Nehmé (Archbishop of Homs) and Georges El-Murr (Archbishop of Petra and Philadelphia).

In this capacity he organized the 7th Congress to the incumbent Melkite bishops and priests incumbent in South America, under the direction of the Melkite Patriarch of Antioch Gregory III Laham in Cordoba from August 30 to September 3, 2010. Arbach was in October 2010, participant at the Special Assembly of the Synod of Bishops (Catholic) for the Middle East in Rome.

On June 23, 2012, Abdo Arbach was appointed archbishop of the Melkite Greek Catholic Archeparchy of Homs, Hama and Yabroud.
