= Caritas Jordan =

Jordanian Catholic charitable organisation

- Caritas Jordan
- كاريتاس الأردن
- Established: 1967; 59 years ago
- Purpose: humanitarian, development, advocacy
- Location: Amman, Jordan
- Coordinates: 31.9482°N 35.9314°E
- Official language: Arabic, English
- Director General: Wael Sulieman
- Affiliations: Caritas Internationalis, Caritas Middle East and North Africa
- Staff: around 400 (2024)
- Volunteers: 3000 (2020)
- Website: www.caritasjordan.org.jo

Caritas Jordan (Arabic: كاريتاس الأردن) is a Jordanian Catholic charitable organisation.

It is a member of the global Caritas Internationalis confederation and of the regional Caritas Middle East and North Africa.

== History ==
Caritas Jordan was founded in 1967 with the purpose of providing aid to the Palestinian refugees arriving in Jordan as a consequence of the Six-Day War. The organisation was officially registered with the Ministry of Social Affairs on 15 June 1968. Since its inception, Caritas Jordan has continued to work with refugees and people from Jordan experiencing poverty.

In the aftermath of the Gulf War (1990–1991), Caritas Jordan assisted individuals arriving from Iraq. The organisation also supported Iraqi refugees following the invasion of Iraq in 2003 and during the Iraqi civil war (2006–2008). The Syrian civil war, which began in 2011, led to a significant influx of Syrian refugees, and Caritas Jordan provided essential aid to many of them. Additionally, during the War in Iraq (2013–2017), the organisation helped Iraqi refugees arriving in 2014 from the Nineveh Plains and Mosul.

== Work ==
In 2020, Caritas Jordan operated 17 centres across the country to provide services for people in need. These are located in Ajlun, Al Husn, Al-Karak, As-Salt, Amman, Fuhais, Irbid, Jerash, Madaba, Mafraq, Zarqa. Some of these centres are health clinics which provide general medicine and dentistry services to patients free of charge for the needy and refugees. Others provide social welfare services or education.

Specific programmes target refugees from Syria and from Iraq, and Caritas Jordan also supports vulnerable migrant workers, notably from Southeast Asia, with health care services, legal and other assistance. Finally, the organisation targets vulnerable Jordanians, such as poor families with many children or the elderly.

In 2023, Caritas Jordan provided over 129,000 services, with 84% in the health sector, 10% in counselling, and 3% each in education and humanitarian assistance. These services reached nearly 34,000 individuals, of whom 68% were Syrian, 15% Jordanian, and 9% Iraqi.

Caritas Jordan funds its activities through grants received by other member organisations of the Caritas Internationalis confederation, UN agencies such as UNHCR, different European governments, and local foundations such as the Royal Health Awareness Society. Caritas Jordan is also raising funds itself.
