= Augustin Farah =

Lebanese archbishop (1910–1983)

Lebanese Republic
- Archeparch of Zahle and Forzol
- Native name: أوغستين فراح
- Church: Melkite Greek Catholic Church
- Archdiocese: Melkite Greek Catholic Archeparchy of Zahle and Forzol
- In office: 25 August 1977 – 31 March 1983
- Predecessor: Jean Bassoul
- Successor: André Haddad
- Previous posts: Archeparch of Tripoli (1964-1977); Eparch of Tripoli (1961-1964)

Orders
- Ordination: 8 September 1937
- Consecration: 18 June 1961 by Maximos IV Sayegh

Personal details
- Born: 4 May 1910 Kara, Syria vilayet, Ottoman Empire
- Died: 31 March 1983 (aged 72)

Augustin Farah (4 May 1910 in Kara, Syria – 31 March 1983) was an archbishop of the Melkite Greek Catholic Archeparchy of Tripoli and the Melkite Greek Catholic Archeparchy of Zahle and Forzol.

== Ecclesiastical career ==
He was ordained a priest on 8 September 1937. Farah was appointed to the Archeparchy of Tripoli on 7 March 1961 and was an ordained bishop on 18 June 1961. The ordination was headed by the Patriarch of Antioch Maximos IV Sayegh, SMSP, at his co-consecrators were the Archbishops Philippe Nabaa of Beirut and Byblos and Athanase Ach-Chaer, BC, of Banyas. When the Diocese of Tripoli was elevated to the Archdiocese, Farah also received on 18 November 1964 the title of archbishop. From 1962 to 1965 he was a participant at all meetings of the Second Vatican Council. In 1965, Farah briefly served as the Apostolic Administrator of Jerusalem. On 25 August 1977, he was appointed Jean Bassoul's successor at the Melkite Greek Catholic Archeparchy of Zahle and Forzol and ran it until his death on 31 March 1983. He was succeeded by André Haddad, BS.
