= Padada =

Municipality in Davao del Sur, Philippines

- Municipality
- Municipality of Padada
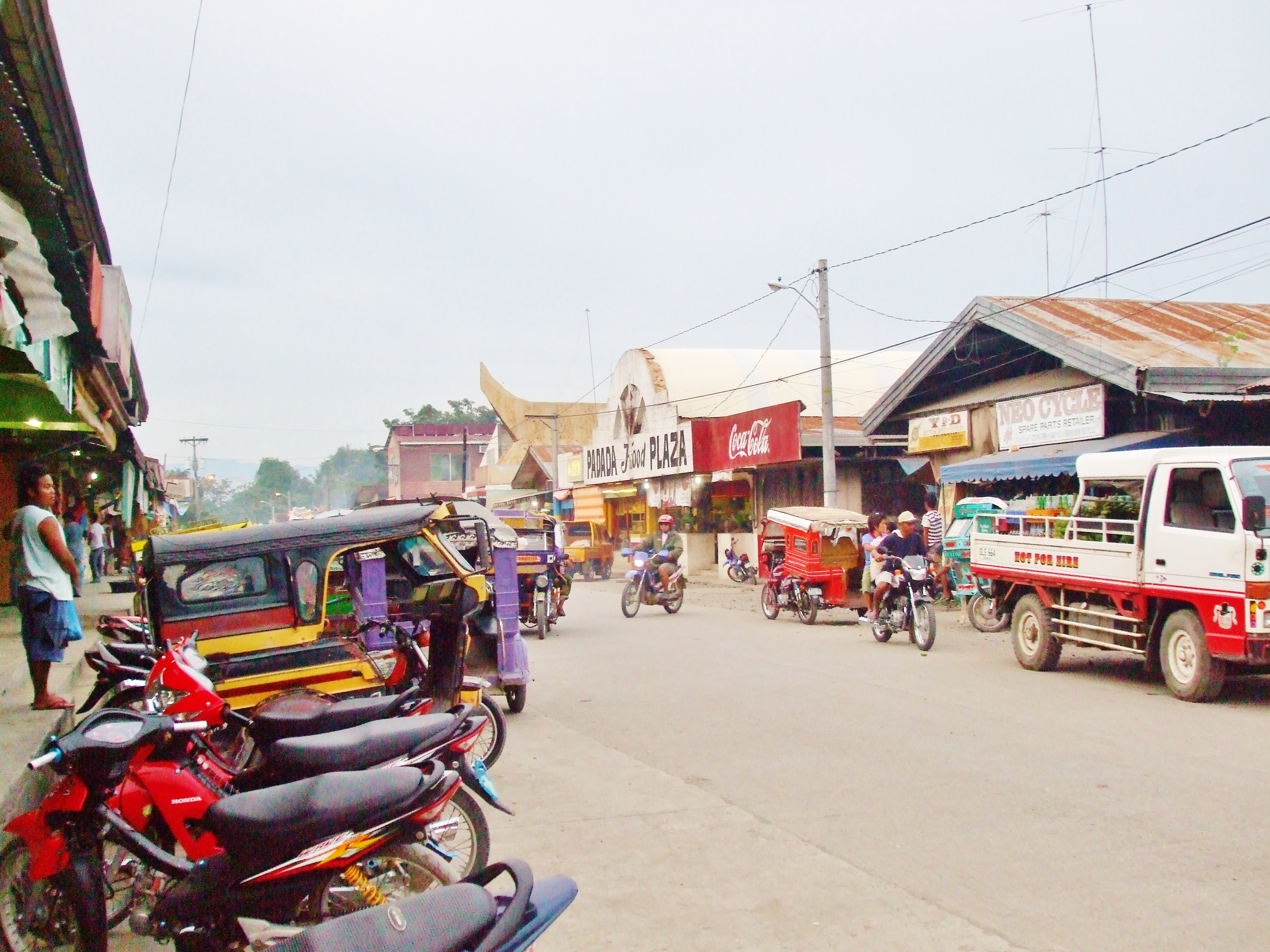
- Downtown area

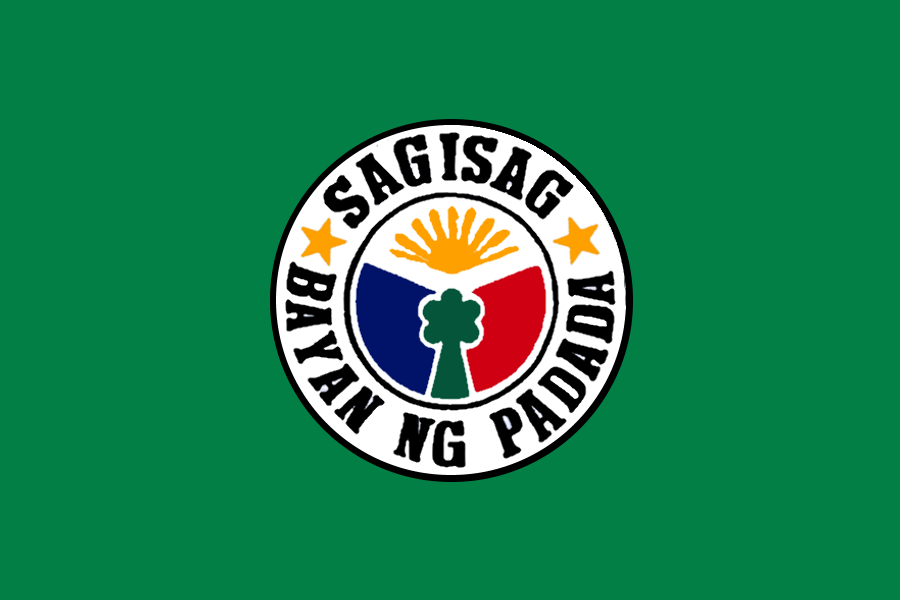
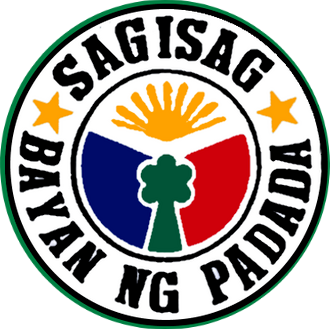
- Flag Seal

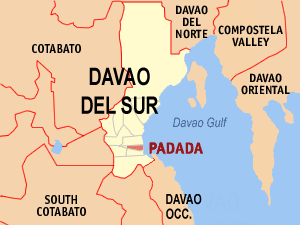
- Map of Davao del Sur with Padada highlighted
- Interactive map of Padada
- Location within the Philippines
- Coordinates: 6°38′21″N 125°20′30″E
- Country: Philippines
- Region: Davao Region
- Province: Davao del Sur
- District: Lone district
- Founded: July 15, 1949
- Barangays: 17 (see Barangays)

Government
  - Type: Sangguniang Bayan
  - Mayor: Juwill Carpentero
  - Vice Mayor: Carmelo M. De Los Cientos V
  - Representative: John Tracy F. Cagas
  - Municipal Council: Members: Carmelo M. delos Cientos IV; Tyrone S. dela Cerna; Prince Amando A. Razonable II; Noel L. Depalubos; Darwin T. Gepitulan; Jo-ann R. Roilo; Jundel B. Caminero
  - Electorate: 22,802 voters (2025)

Area
  - Total: 83.00 km^{2} (32.05 sq mi)
- Elevation: 22 m (72 ft)
- Highest elevation: 346 m (1,135 ft)
- Lowest elevation: 0 m (0 ft)

Population (2024 census)
  - Total: 32,117
  - Density: 387.0/km^{2} (1,002/sq mi)
  - Households: 7,925

Economy
  - Income class: 2nd municipal income class
  - Poverty incidence: 11.14% (2023)
  - Revenue: ₱ 178.7 million (2024)
  - Assets: ₱ 366 million (2024)
  - Expenditure: ₱ 178.7 million (2024)
  - Liabilities: ₱ 34.31 million (2024)

Service provider
  - Electricity: Davao del Sur Electric Cooperative (DASURECO)
- Time zone: UTC+8 (PST)
- ZIP code: 8007
- PSGC: 1102411000
- IDD : area code: +63 (0)82
- Native languages: Davawenyo; Cebuano; Kalagan; Tagalog; Ata Manobo
- Website: www.padada.gov.ph

Padada, officially the Municipality of Padada (Cebuano: Lungsod sa Padada; Tagalog: Bayan ng Padada), is a municipality in the province of Davao del Sur, Philippines. According to the 2024 census, it has a population of 32,117 people, making it the least populated municipality in the province.

Its boundaries were defined by Republic Act No. 1008, approved June 12, 1954.

"Padada" refers to a tree from the mangrove family which were once abundant along its entire shoreline and estuaries but due to encroachment and indiscriminate fish farming, the Padada trees became extinct.

== History ==
Guihing was once the original sitio of Padada and its formation was brought about by Mr. Walstrom, an American expatriate who owned a vast coconut plantation in the area called the Mindanao Estate Co., together with the effort of Don Bartolome Hernandez Sr., a coconut planter and a pioneer of the area too.

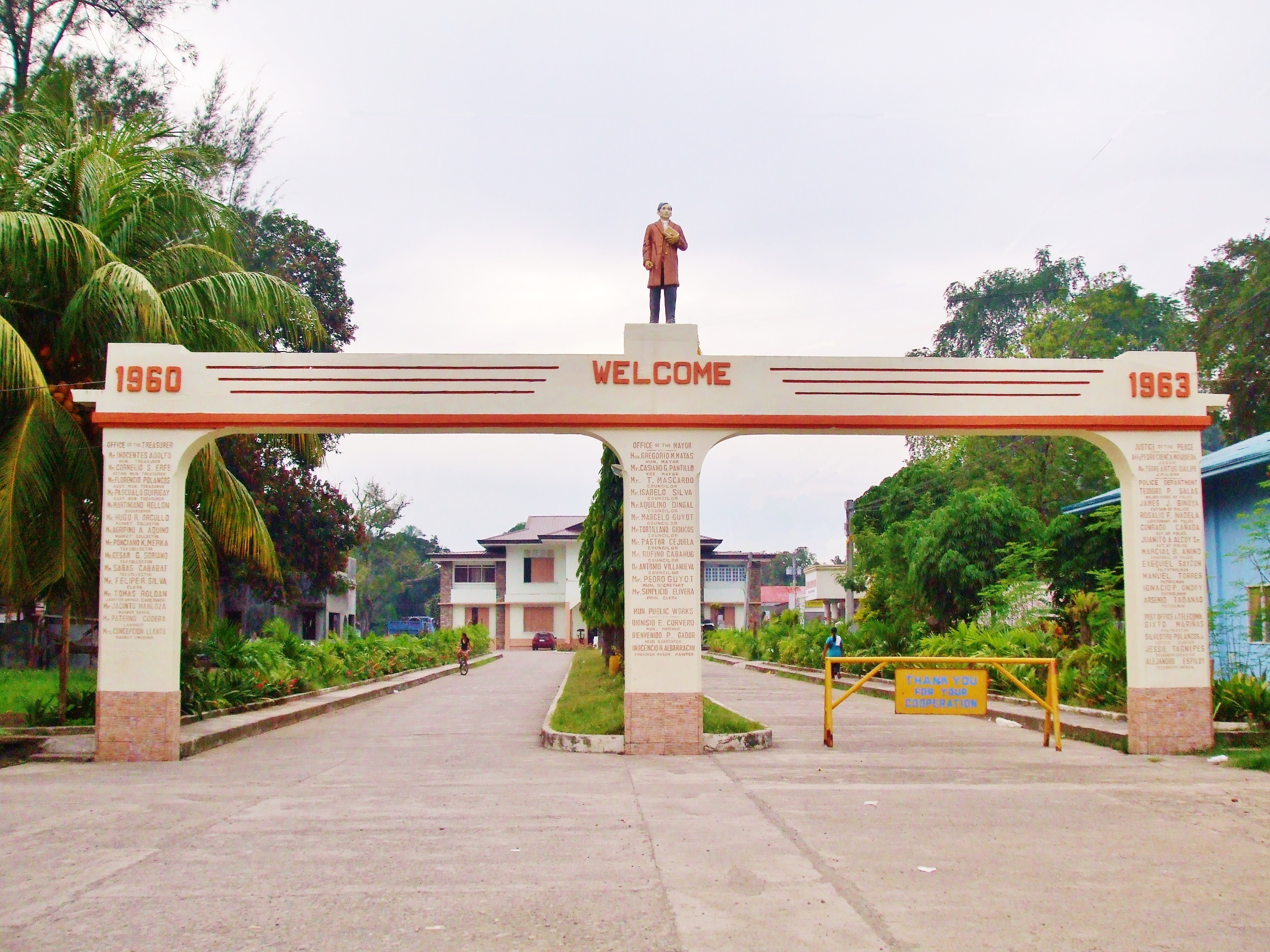
Entrance to Municipal hall

Padada as a town was organized on July 15, 1949, after its creation into such by virtue of Executive Order # 236 of Elpidio Quirino, then president of the Republic of the Philippines. The territorial jurisdiction of Padada originally embraced the present town of Santa Maria, Malalag, and Sulop in the south, Kiblawan in the west, Hagonoy in the north, and part of Matanao in the north-west with the seat of government in the barrio of Limonso which is now the Padada Poblacion.

In 1946, after the proclamation of the Philippine Republic, hordes of home seekers mostly Filipino veterans of the Second World War headed by Major Froilan Mascardo Matas, settled the area called Padada Valley occupying several repossessed Japanese Plantations in the vicinity. With the influx of numerous migrants of all walks of life, Limonso as the center of trade, grew into a large community, and qualified to become a separate municipality. As early as January 1949, the bid for the creation of Padada Town was prepared, finally securing its approval through Executive Order No. 236, dated July 15, 1949.

Antonio Go Pace was the first mayor by appointment who was erstwhile a councilor of Santa Cruz. With him, Innocentes Zanoria Adolfo was also assigned as the first municipal treasurer of Padada. The creation of Limonso now Padada into a municipality and the subdivision of the poblacion into commercial and residential districts was attributed to him. Gregorio Matas was the first elected mayor and held the position for three consecutive terms with Mr. Felix Brandares as vice mayor and in which the municipal building was possible thru his effort. Atty. Isidro M. Ordaneza succeeded the former and holds the longest tenure of office—16 years from 1963 and re-elected again in 1967 and 1971 until March 1979. Padada ABC gymnasium was built during his term.

However, in the process of re-organization of local governments by President Ferdinand E. Marcos, then Vice Mayor Benjamin A. Saragena was designated Acting Mayor of Padada, assuming office on March 19, 1979. In the 1980 local elections, Acting Mayor Saragena was elected mayor with Pascuala Dizon as Vice Mayor and his entire Sangguniang Bayan ticket was swept into office.

After the People Power Revolution in EDSA, Corazon C. Aquino appointed Atty. Carmelo R. De Los Cientos III as OIC of this Municipality and assumes the office with Elpidio R. Pantojan as OIC Vice Mayor and 8 OIC Sangguniang Banyan.

Prior to the 1988 local elections, all OIC Municipal Officials we made to resign during the campaign period from December 1987 to February 1988. It was on this short period of time that another OIC ruled the municipality. OIC Mayor Leonardo U. Pillerin and Vice Mayor Margarito Mendez were installed from December 1987 to February 1988, together with the 8 OIC S.B. members. During the 1988 elections, the people of Padada elected Atty. Carmelo R. De los Cientos III as municipal mayor and Elpidio R. Pantojan as vice mayor. Both were re-elected and served for three terms. In the 1998 local election, former Mayor Benjamin A. Saragena won the election of mayor and Antonio N. Razonable as the Vice Mayor.

In the 2001 local elections, Atty. Antonio N. Razonable and Pedro F. Caminero Jr. won the mayoralty and Vice Mayoralty post. Both were re-elected and served from 2001 to 2010. The 2010 elections, which made use of Precinct Count Optical Scan (PCOS) system, paved the way to Pedro F. Caminero Jr, a vice mayor for three terms during the administration of Razonable, to reign the local government of Padada as the new mayor. He was accompanied by Alexander V. Morales as his vice mayor and partner in the local governance.

In the May 2013 national election, he was replaced by Atty. Gladys A. Razonable-Gascon, the daughter of then Mayor Antonio N. Razonable and the first female mayor of Padada. In the May 2016 national election, she was replaced by the former mayor Pedro F. Caminero Jr. He was accompanied by Francisco "Frashale" Guerrero Jr as his vice mayor.

In the May 2022 National and Local Elections, paved the way to Francisco L. Guerrero, Jr, a Vice Mayor for two terms during the Administration of Caminero, to reign the local government of Padada as new Mayor. Juwill G. Carpentero, won the Vice Mayoral race, a Sangguniang Bayan Member for two terms during the Administration of Caminero.

On December 15, 2019, a magnitude 6.9 earthquake struck at around 2:11 p.m. with the epicenter about 6 kilometers northwest of Padada.

== Geography ==
Padada is part of the province of Davao del Sur lying between 125° degrees 20° east longitude and 6 degree 28°44° north latitude. It is bounded on the north by the municipality of Hagonoy, on the west by the municipality of Kiblawan, on the south by the municipalities of Sulop and Malalag and on the east by Davao Gulf. The Poblacion is approximately 12 kilometres (7.5 mi) from Digos, the capital town of Davao del Sur.

=== Land area ===
The total land area of the municipality is 8,300 hectares (21,000 acres), 65% of which is planted to coconut and 35% to banana, corn, rice and other crops. It has three urban barangays namely, NCO, Almendras, and Quirino that totals to one hundred eighty one hectares. Three of the remaining fourteen barangays are located along the coastal portion and the other on the internal area. Two (2%) of the total provincial land area is what constitute the municipality of Padada.

=== Climate ===
Hot and humid most of the year. May to November is typhoon season. The mean annual temperature of the municipality is between 22.4 to 31.5 °C (72.3 to 88.7 °F). The annual rainfall range from 1,500 to 2,500 millimetres (59 to 98 in). The coldest part of the year is usually during the month of December to February and the hottest month are April and May. Rainfall distribution is more or less even during the year.

Climate data for Padada, Davao del Sur
Month	Jan	Feb	Mar	Apr	May	Jun	Jul	Aug	Sep	Oct	Nov	Dec	Year
Mean daily maximum °C (°F)	30 (86)	30 (86)	31 (88)	32 (90)	31 (88)	30 (86)	29 (84)	30 (86)	30 (86)	30 (86)	30 (86)	30 (86)	30 (87)
Mean daily minimum °C (°F)	23 (73)	23 (73)	23 (73)	24 (75)	24 (75)	24 (75)	24 (75)	24 (75)	24 (75)	24 (75)	24 (75)	23 (73)	24 (74)
Average precipitation mm (inches)	59 (2.3)	46 (1.8)	41 (1.6)	54 (2.1)	105 (4.1)	159 (6.3)	179 (7.0)	197 (7.8)	162 (6.4)	147 (5.8)	102 (4.0)	65 (2.6)	1,316 (51.8)
Average rainy days	12.3	11.7	12.2	14.5	22.6	25.6	26.6	27.5	25.5	26.0	21.2	16.0	241.7
Source: Meteoblue

=== Barangays ===
Padada is politically subdivided into 17 barangays. Each barangay consists of puroks while some have sitios.

Barangay	Code	Urban/Rural	Population (2007)	Population (2010)
Almendras (Poblacion)	112411001	Urban	4196	3,983
Don Sergio Osmena, Sr.	112411002	Rural	647	776
Harada Butai	112411003	Rural	1452	1,728
Lower Katipunan	112411004	Rural	686	683
Lower Limonzo	112411005	Rural	1030	1,173
Lower Malinao	112411006	Rural	1033	1,198
N C Ordaneza District (Poblacion)	112411007	Urban	2332	2,401
Northern Paligue	112411008	Rural	1703	1,522
Palili	112411009	Rural	1054	1,064
Piape	112411010	Rural	1429	1,394
Punta Piape	112411011	Rural	1118	1,056
Quirino District (Poblacion)	112411012	Urban	1831	1,721
San Isidro	112411013	Rural	1366	1,407
Southern Paligue	112411014	Rural	1329	1,455
Tulugan	112411015	Rural	845	973
Upper Limonzo	112411016	Rural	1934	2,089
Upper Malinao	112411017	Rural	1142	1,101

=== Natural environment ===
Piape Hills

It is a 65-hectare (160-acre) site, 4.5 kilometers east of Poblacion Padada facing Davao Gulf. Known as the crocodile mountain for when viewed above it look like a sleeping crocodile resting in the shore of Padada. It is being identified as the Provincial Jamboree Site and an Agro-forest area of the municipality. The hill is covered with shrubs, trees and rocks. It is planted with trees since 1972, as an environmental concern of the people of Padada. A potential mountain trail for tourist. On top of the summit, you will have a panoramic view of Padada Valley, Davao Gulf, Mt. Apo, and Mt Matutum. It can be reached by 30–45 minutes hiking from the foot of the hill.

Piape Reef

A coral reef with an area of more or less four (4) hectares located within the municipal fish sanctuary. The whole area is covered with a variety of corals and 10–12 depth fathom blue clear water used to be the breeding ground of variety of species of marine life. The area will submerge during high tide and is visible during low tide. It is one of the best take off point of scuba divers and a scuba diving destination in the south. It is estimated to be nine (9) kilometers from the Poblacion and only around five (5) kilometers from the Piape shoreline. It is accessible by all type of land transportation from Poblacion Padada to barangay Piape and by boat or motorized banca from Piape to the reef. A prelude to Piape coral reef is a sandy reef locally known as Pasig which will also submerge during high tide but is only ½ hectare in area surrounded with a knee-length muddy water not conducive to swimming and diving.

Piape Marine Sanctuary

It is located adjacent to Piape Reef facing Piape Hills. It is 4.5 km east of Poblacion facing Davao Gulf and can be reached on a motorized boat in 5–7 minutes. It has an area of 50 hectares (120 acres) surrounded with buoys from BFAR (Bureau of Fisheries and Aquatic Resources (Philippines)) for its protection and identification. It is a breeding ground of 50–60 species of marine life.

== Demographics ==
Population census of Padada
Year	Pop.	±% p.a.
1960	12,147	—
1970	14,402	+1.72%
1975	15,648	+1.68%
1980	17,218	+1.93%
1990	21,051	+2.03%
1995	22,384	+1.16%
2000	24,112	+1.61%
2007	25,127	+0.57%
2010	25,724	+0.86%
2015	26,587	+0.63%
2020	29,878	+2.49%
2024	32,117	+1.75%
Source: Philippine Statistics Authority

Based on National Statistical Coordination Board, the total population was 25,724 as of May 1, 2010, up from 27,127 in the August 2007 census. The registered number of voters is 16,815 as of 2010.

=== Languages ===
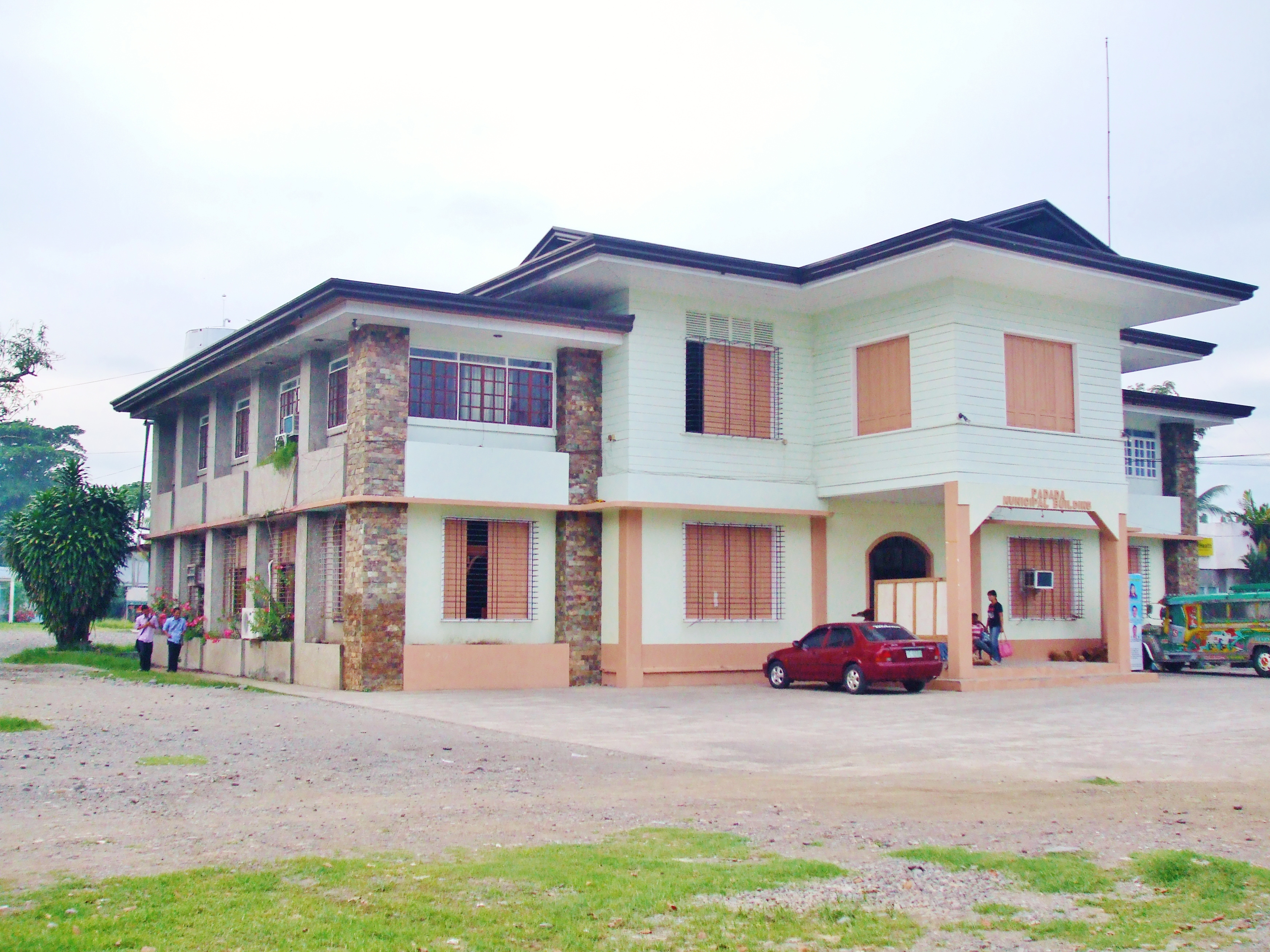
The Municipal Hall of Padada

English, Pilipino, Chinese, Cebuano is the mother tongue spoken by 68.82% of the total population. Other dialects spoken in the area are; B´laan, 6.40%; Bagobo 2.88%; Hiligaynon (Ilongo) 1.70%; Manobo 6.72%; Ilocano 1.22% and Tagacaolos 8. 36%

English and Filipino [formerly spelled Pilipino], which is based on Tagalog, is the official language. About 95 percent of the population speaks Visaya. English is widely and commonly used for educational, governmental, and commercial purposes.

=== Religion ===
Majority of the population 17,907 are Roman Catholics, a few are Muslims and Protestants, as well as Iglesia Ni Cristo and Mormons.

==== St. Michael Parish ====
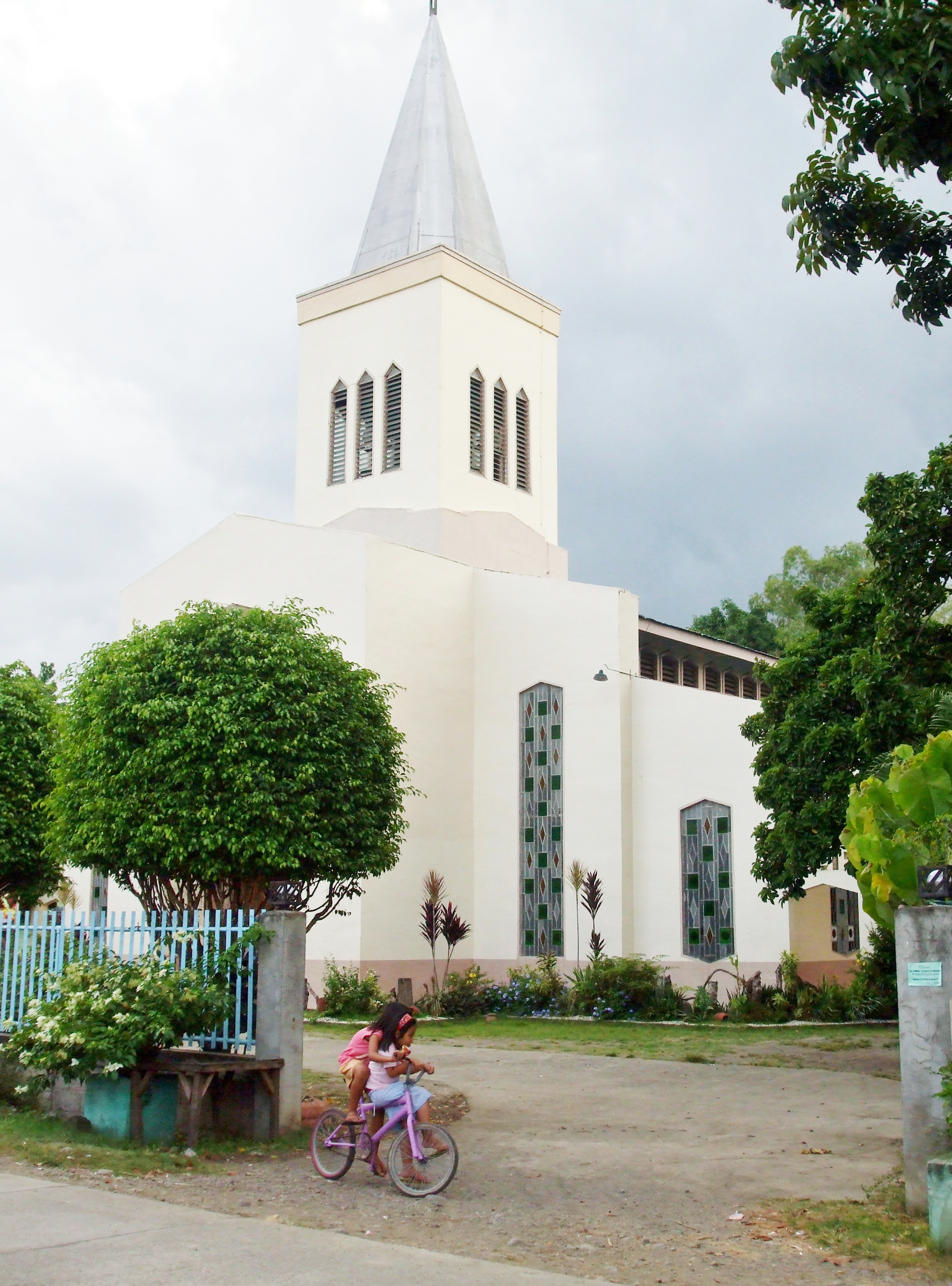
St. Michael Parish Padada

As early as 1848 the Spanish missionaries set foot on Davao. Fr. Francisco Lopez from the Augustinian Recollects together with Don Jose Oyanguren came to establish a Christian settlement after defeating local chieftain, Datu Bago. The following years, the Jesuits took over the apostolic responsibility from the Recollects. Instrumental to the evangelization and expansion of the Davao church were missionaries like Fr. Quirico More, Mateo Gisbert, Pablo Pastells and Saturnino Urius. The entire Mindanao area was under the Diocese of Cebu since 1595, until some parts were placed under the jurisdiction of Jaro in 1865. On April 10, 1910, the Diocese of Zamboanga was created and took all ecclesiastical territories in Mindanao away from Cebu. Then, on January 20, 1933, Pope Pius XI created Cagayan de Oro as second diocese in Mindanao. During this time Mindanao was divided into two dioceses, Zamboanga and Cagayan de Oro.

In 1934 because of the scarce number of missionaries and since Davao has only eight Jesuits administering it, Bishop Luis del Rosario of Zamboanga sought for foreign help and one of those who responded was the Foreign Mission Society of Quebec or popularly known as P.M.E. Fathers or La Société des Missions-Étrangères (in French: Pretres de Missions-Étrangères,). In 1937, the first P.M.E. Fathers who arrive here in Davao were Fr. Clovis Rondeau, Omer Leblanc, Leo Lamy, Conrad Cote, and Msgr. Clovis Thibault who was the main proponent of establishing the Parish of Padada. After the first five P.M.E. Fathers, many others followed. On December 17, 1949, Davao became the Prelature Nullius to which Clovis Thibault was appointed as administrator.

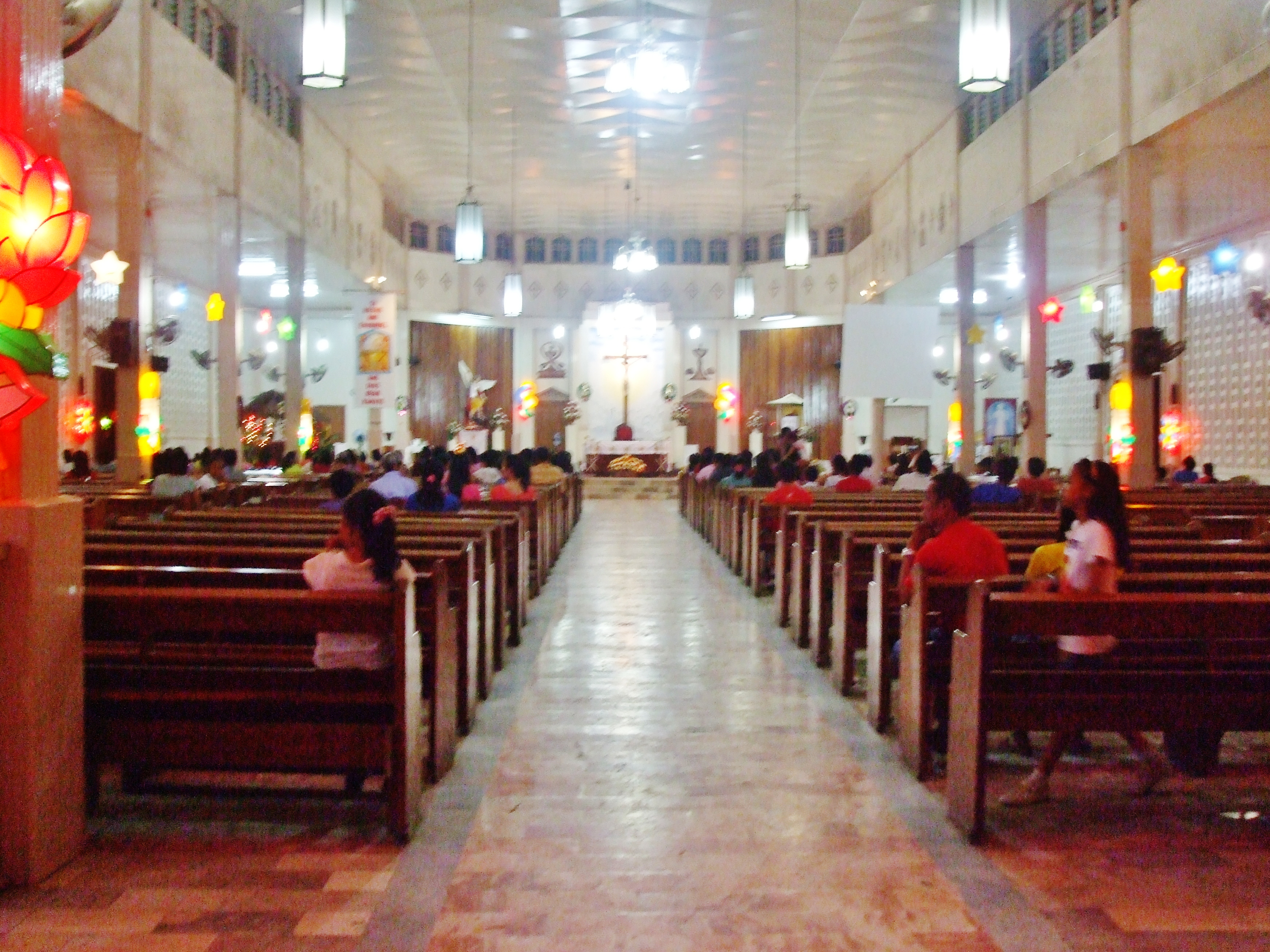
St. Michael Parish Of Padada

On June 29, 1951, Pope Pius XII elevated the Diocese of Cagayan de Oro to an archdiocese together with Jaro. The Archdiocese of Cagayan de Oro became the first archdiocese in Mindanao. It had as its suffragans all the dioceses and prelatures then in Mindanao: Surigao, Cotabato, Sulu, Davao, Ozamis, and Zamboanga which had been its mother diocese. It became an archdiocese seven years ahead of its mother diocese, Zamboanga.

And on December 31, 1954, Clovis Thibault, P.M.E. was appointed as prelate and on February 11, 1955, he was ordained as bishop. When Davao was later elevated into a diocese, Bishop Thibault was canonically instituted as its ruling bishop on July 11, 1966.

On the account of Fr. Paul Gravel, P.M.E. in his 25th Padada Parish anniversary message dated May 1, 1977, he recalls of the establishment of the Parish. It started with the proposal of Msgr. Clovis Thibault during the Parish fiesta of Digos on August 22, 1952. In the following month September 7, together with his close friend Diosdado Ypil they ventured the new undertaking. They were welcomed by the people of Padada in the person of Mayor Gregorio Matas, Bonifacio Semilla the president of Catholic Association and many others who were supportive of the said plan.

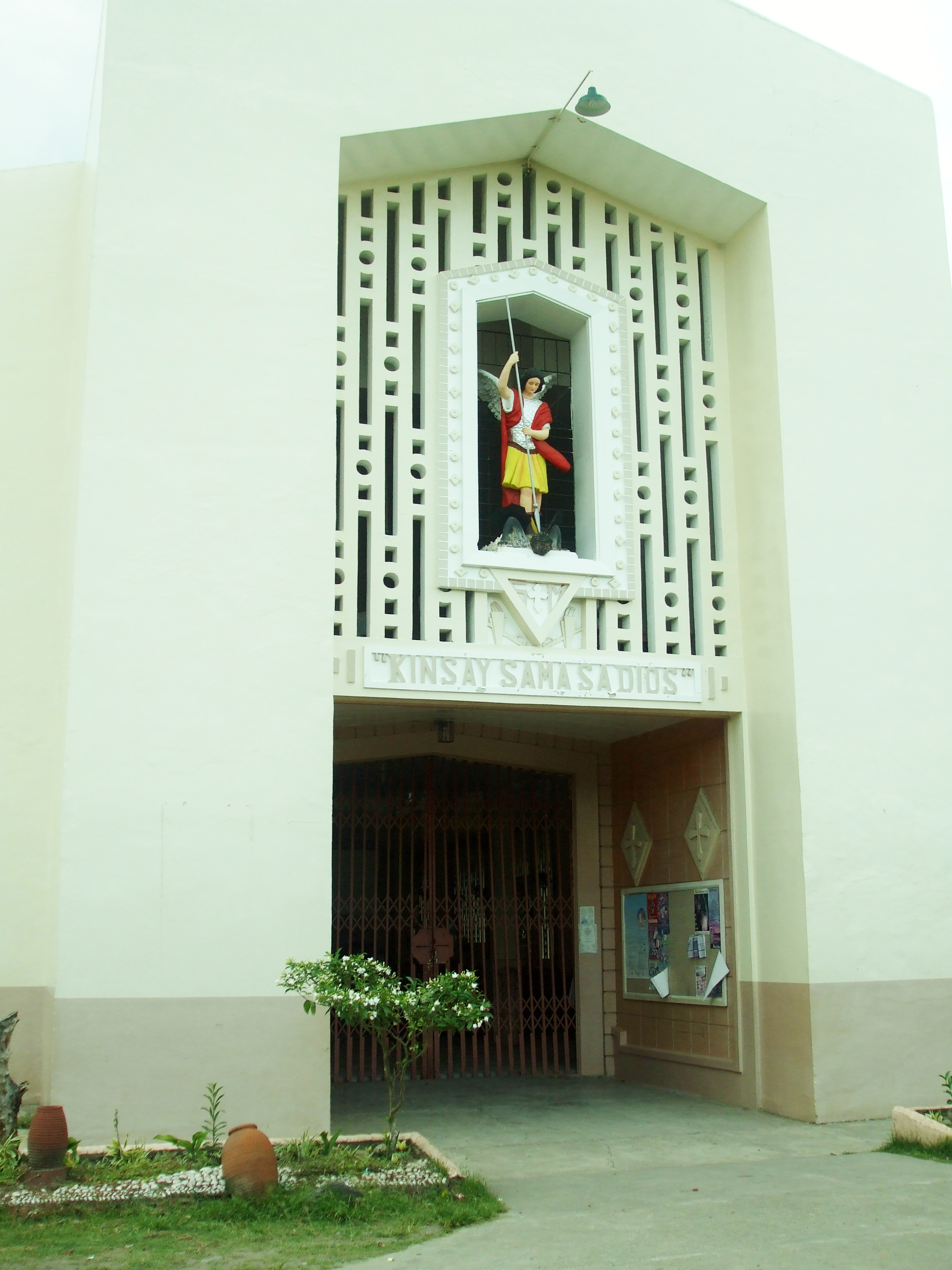
Padada Parish Church

Christians during this time likely would have been excited upon hearing the news. Given that Santa Cruz long before became a parish in 1941 and Digos in 1948, to some degree Padada reached the appropriate moment to become a parish. At that moment Padada had only a chapel situated near the highway, standing near the bread fruit or locally known as ‘kamansi’ (Artocarpus altilis) that is within the vicinity and residence of a certain Rodem. Right after that day they repaired the old chapel and afterward moved it in the residence of the Yap Family which is the location of the church at present. They effectively did it in three weeks time before their fiesta with the help of the people. They called the project ‘Tagbo’ (encounter). It is uncertain whether they dismantled it piece by piece or carried the entire structure all the way to its new location like what Filipinos commonly do in bayanihan which greatly witness the spirit of communal unity and effort. It was an enormous undertaking that they informed and sought help from leaders like Mr. Ronda of Hagonoy, Mr. Pascual, Diel and Calumpong of Malalag, and other places like Pawa, Kiblawan, Tanwalang, and Santa Maria. There were hundreds of them including the tribal minorities of B’laans of Maragaa and the Tagacaolos of Malalag shared their earnest involvement of the said project. On September 29 that year, Fr. Gravel celebrated the annual fiesta of St. Michael the archangel in the new site. They completed the initial stage that sets another milestone in the lives of the people in Padada. After the fiesta, the same spirit of enthusiasm and solidarity continued to intensify as they started to plan the construction of a bigger church. Finally, on July 6, 1953, they laid the foundation of the structure. Again, the structure that was planned needed help from the affiliated communities. It was a protracted effort to finish the main and internal structure of the church that they continually relied on the financial aid from few of the wealthy families of the neighboring municipalities and the masons who volunteered their service.

Fr. Gravel was the first and said to be the longest assigned priest of Padada. Ambiguously he was remembered serving the parish for ten years. The parish records show that there had been a great deal of assistance coming from the P.M.E.'s who took the role as Parish priests, but probably he stayed a little longer. Even at present his persona endured in the memories of the people as the driving force who laid the foundations of their dream.

== Economy ==
Poverty incidence of Padada (%)

Source: Philippine Statistics Authority

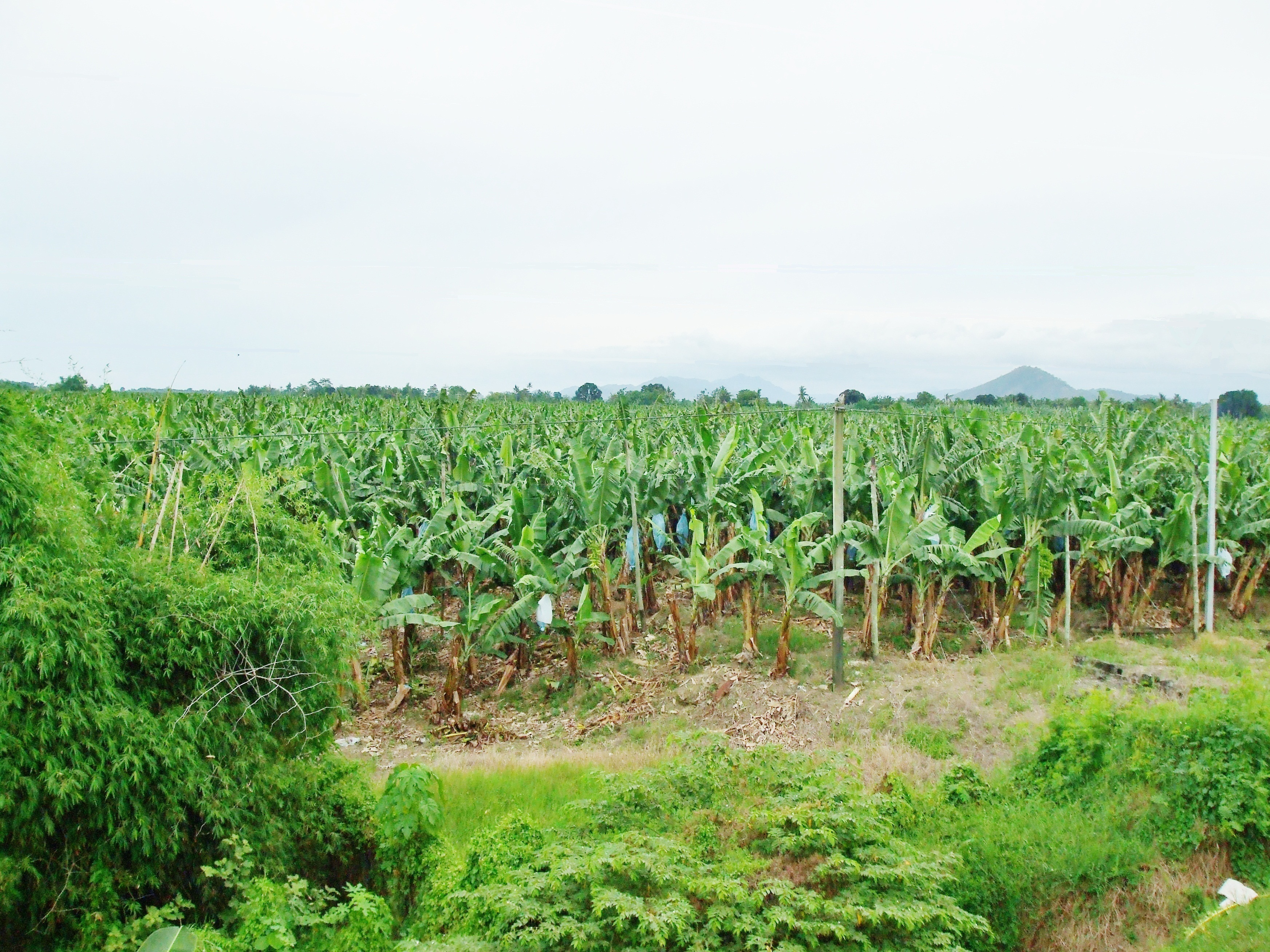
Banana Plantation, Padada

Padada is basically an agricultural area where coconuts abound and to which copra is the main produce, maize comes to second as the important crops that is grown including bananas and cassava. Other crops include sugarcane, mangoes and papayas. Livestock on farms include chickens, goats and hogs.

Marine fishing is an important industry. Barangays along the coastal portion are mostly converted into fishponds that yields bangus (milkfish) and shrimp. The Poblacion serves as the economic and the business center.

== Government ==
=== Elected officials ===
Members of the Padada Municipal council (2022-2025):

- Mayor: Francisco L. Guerrero Jr.
- Vice Mayor: Juwill Carpentero

-Sangguniang Bayan Member-

- Antonietta Razonable-Tecson
- Tyrone Dela Cerna
- Jundel Caminero
- Jo-Ann Razonable-Roilo
- Noel Depalubos
- Charisma Razonable
- Emma Bongcawel
- Emil Libradores

== Transportation ==
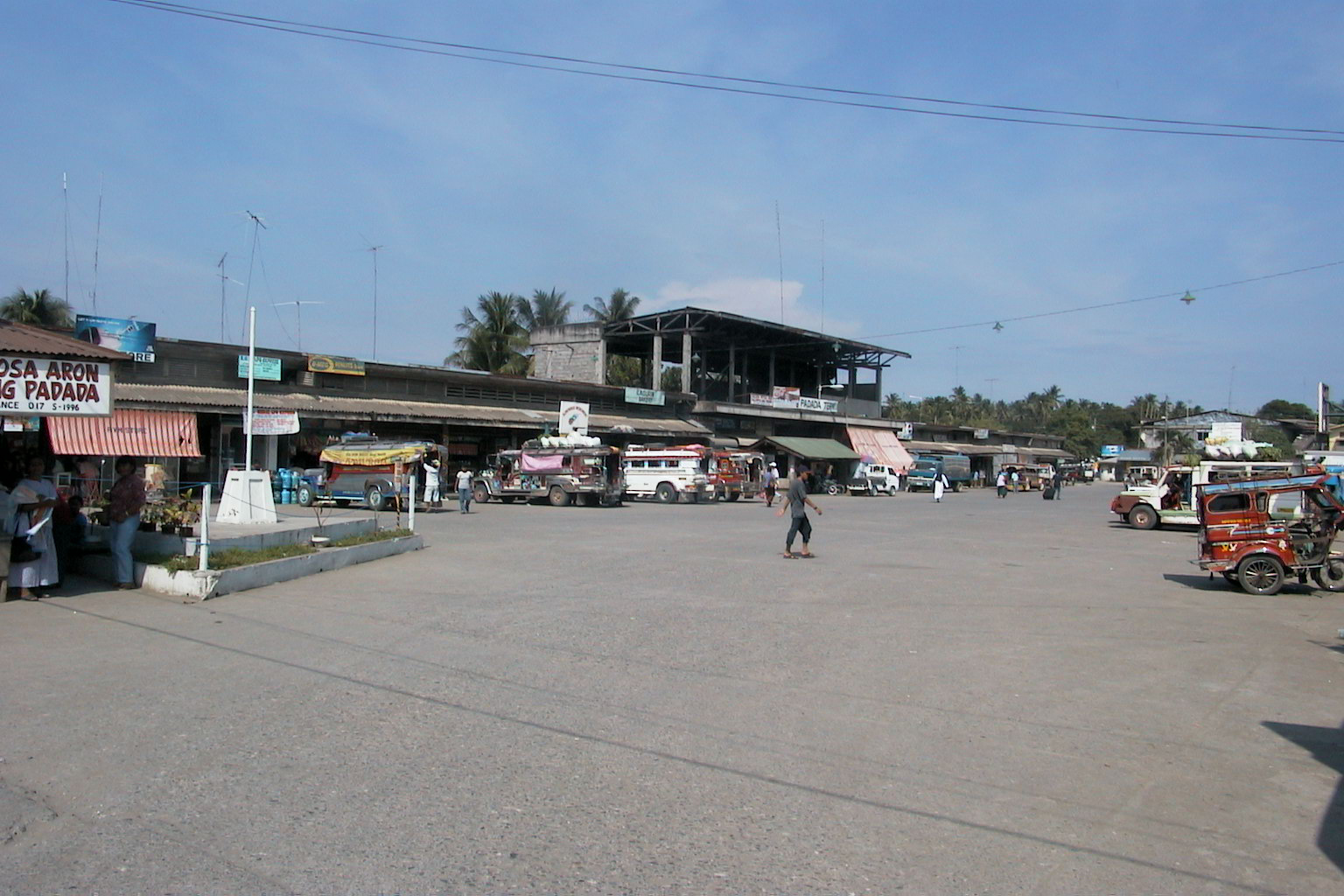
Padada Transport Terminal

Padada Overland transport terminal is at the center of the town, where all the major businesses, commercial establishments and public market are situated. Concrete-paved national highway runs along Padada connecting Davao City and General Santos and adjacent provinces like South Cotabato, Sultan Kudarat, Maguindanao del Sur, Cotabato and Santa Cruz Province. Air and water transport is accessible in the area through the international air and sea ports located in Davao City and General Santos. Jeepneys and buses are used widely for major routes. Mostly Tricycles in the poblacion and in neighboring barangays. Bikes are used for leisure and sporting events.

== Education ==
Private schools

- ATO Padada Christian School
- Saint Michael's School of Padada
- Southeastern College of Padada
- Homepal Padada

Public schools

- Limonzo Elementary School
- Piape Elementary School
- Padada South Elementary School
- Padada Central Elementary School
- German Lanticse Elementary School
- Lower Katipunan Primary School
- Harada Butai Primary School
- Don Sergio Osmeña Primary School
- Mariano Sarona Elementary School
- Padada National High School
- Padada National High School-Malinao Extension
- Carmelo C. Delos Cientos Sr. National Trade School
- Maria Cleta R. Delos Cientos National High School - Piape
- Tulogan Elementary School

== Notable people ==
- Shaina Magdayao – actress (traces her roots in Padada, where her mother is from)
- Vina Morales – singer, actress (traces her roots in Padada, where her mother is from)
- Scottie Thompson – professional basketball player
