= Antoine Hayek =

Melkite Greek Catholic archbishop (1928–2010)

Antoine Hayek B.C.
- Archeparch of Baniyas
- Native name: انطوان حايك
- Church: Melkite Greek Catholic Church
- Archdiocese: Archeparchy of Baniyas
- In office: 19 July 1989 – 2006
- Predecessor: Nicolas Hajj
- Successor: Georges Nicholas Haddad

Orders
- Ordination: 1 August 1954
- Consecration: 11 February 1990 by Maximos V Hakim

Personal details
- Born: 26 August 1928 Maghdouché, Mandatory Lebanese Republic, French Empire
- Died: 1 May 2010 (aged 81)

Antoine Hayek (26 August 1928 – 1 May 2010) was an Eastern Catholic bishop of the Melkite Greek Catholic Church and was archbishop of the Melkite Greek Catholic Archeparchy of Baniyas.

== Life ==
Antoine Hayek joined the Congregation of the Basilians and was ordained on 1 August 1954 to the priesthood.

He was elected by the Holy Synod of the Melkite Greek Catholic Church Archbishop of Archeparchy of Banyas (Caesarea Philippi) and Marjayoun being confirmed by Pope John Paul II on 19 July 1989. His episcopal ordination was performed on 11 February 1990 by Maximos V Hakim, Patriarch of Antioch of the Melkite Greek Catholic Church and his co-consecrators were Joseph Raya, Archbishop of Acre Archeparchy of Graeco-Melkites, and Abraham Nehmé, Archbishop of Homs the Greek Melkites.

Hayek was a member of the Assembly of Catholic Patriarchs and Bishops in Lebanon.

His age-related resignation occurred during the Holy Synod in Ain Traz, which took place from 9 to 14 October 2006.
