= Isidore Battikha =

Syrian archbishop (born 1950)

Isidore Battikha, B.A.
- Melkite Greek Catholic archeparch of Homs
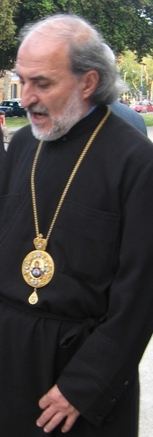
- Melkite Catholic archeparch of Homs Isidore Battikha
- See: Homs
- Appointed: 2006
- In office: 2010
- Predecessor: Abraham Nehmé
- Successor: Jean-Abdo Arbach
- Other post: Titular Bishop of Pelusio dei Greco-Melkiti
- Previous post: Patriarcal Vicar of Damascus (1992-2006)

Orders
- Ordination: 11 April 1980
- Consecration: 10 October 1992 by Maximos V Hakim

Personal details
- Born: 28 July 1950 (age 76) Aleppo
- Denomination: Melkite Greek Catholic Church

Isidore Battikha B.A. (born July 28, 1950 in Aleppo, Syria) is a Syrian archbishop emeritus of the Melkite Greek Catholic Archeparchy of Homs in Syria.

He was also Grand Prior of the Patriarchal Order of the Holy Cross of Jerusalem.

== Life ==
Isidore Battikha was ordained priest on April 11, 1980 and after that was named Chaplain of the Aleppinian Basilian. On August 25, 1992, he was appointed auxiliary bishop of the Melkite Patriarchate of Antioch and named titular bishop of Pelusium of Greek Melkites. On February 9, 2006, he was elected by the Synod of Bishops of the Melkite Greek Catholic Church as the successor of Abraham Nehmé as Archbishop of Homs. The Patriarch of Antioch Maximos V Hakim ordained him to the episcopate on August 25, 1992, and his co-consecrators were Néophytos Edelby, BA and François Abou Mokh, BS. Archbishop Battikha until his resignation was co-consekrator of the Archbishops Elias Chacour and Michel Abrass, BA.

=== Resignation ===
On September 6, 2010 Pope Benedict XVI accepted Battikha's resignation, in accordance with the Code of Canons of the Eastern Churches (CCEO), can. 210. The reasons for his resignation are still unknown, and to the Archeparchy of Homs was named Jean-Abdo Arbach in 2012.

== Distinctions ==
- Grand Prior of the Patriarchal Order of the Holy Cross of Jerusalem
