= Saba Youakim =

Saba Youakim BS
- Archeparch of Petra and Philadelphia in Amman
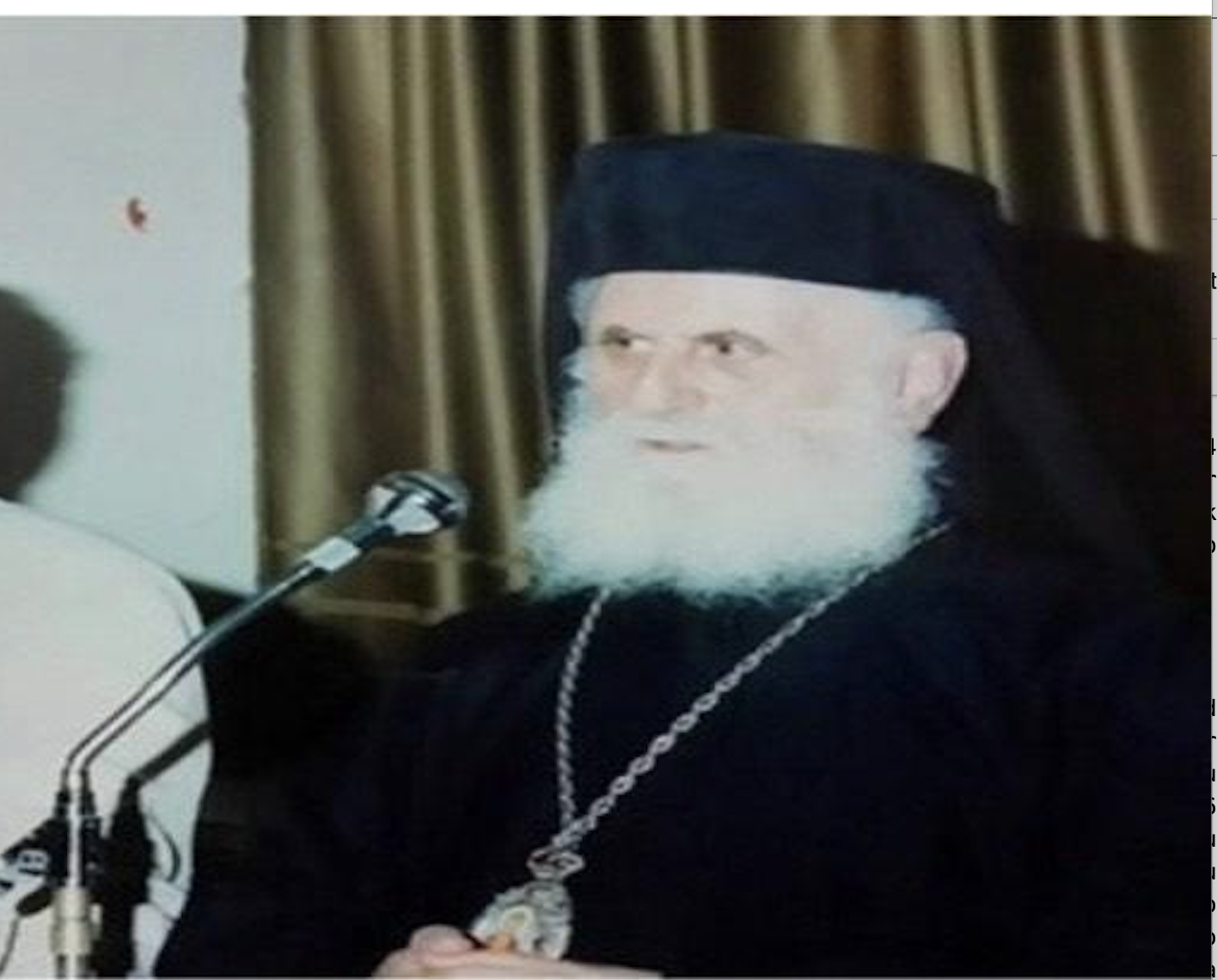
- Church: Melkite Greek Catholic Church
- Archdiocese: Melkite Greek Catholic Archeparchy of Petra and Philadelphia in Amman
- In office: 15 October 1970 – 24 August 1992
- Predecessor: Mikhayl Assaf
- Successor: Georges El-Murr
- Previous posts: Titular Archbishop of Scythopolis (1968-1970); Auxiliary Bishop of Patriarchate of Antioch (1968-1970)

Orders
- Ordination: 30 November 1939
- Consecration: 29 September 1968 by Maximos V Hakim

Personal details
- Born: 2 June 1914 Wardeih, Damascus Sanjak, Syria vilayet, Ottoman Empire
- Died: 6 March 2003 (aged 88)

Saba Youakim, BS (born on 2 June 1914 in El Wardieh in Baalbek, Lebanon – died on 6 March 2003) was Archbishop of the Melkite Greek Catholic Archeparchy of Petra and Philadelphia in Amman.

== Life ==
Saba Youakim was ordained to the priesthood on November 30, 1939, to be chaplain of the Ordo Basilianus Sanctissimi Salvatoris Melkitarum (BS). He was appointed Archimandrite in 1968 and Superior general of his religious community. On September 9, 1968, he was appointed Titular Archbishop of Scythopolis and consecrated on September 29, 1968. His episcopal ordination was celebrated by the Patriarch of Antioch Maximos V Hakim, with co-consecrators served the archbishops Eftimios Youakim, BS of Zahle and Furzol and Nicolas Hajj, SDS, of Banyas .

On October 15, 1970, Youakim was elected by the Synod as Archbishop of Petra and Philadelphia in Jordan and was the successor of the Archbishop Mikhayl Assaf. On August 24, 1992, he resigned for reasons of age, and until his death on March 6, 2003, was Emeritus Archbishop. He was succeeded by Archbishop Georges El-Murr.

During his tenure, Youakim participated in the Second Vatican Council. He ordinated Issam John Darwich and Anargyros Printezis to the episcopate. Youakim was also co-consecrator of Archbishop Michel Hakim of Saint-Sauveur de Montréal, Archbishop François Abou Mokh, BS, Auxiliary Bishop in Antioch, Bishop Ercole Lupinacci of Lungro], and future Melkite Patriarch of Antioch, Gregory III Laham, BS, and Archbishop Andre Haddad, BS, of Zahle and Furzol.
