= André Haddad =

Lebanese archbishop (1930–2017)

André Haddad BS
- Archeparch of Zahle and Forzol
- Native name: أندريه حداد
- Church: Melkite Greek Catholic Church
- Archdiocese: Melkite Greek Catholic Archeparchy of Zahle and Forzol
- In office: 14 June 1983 – 24 June 2010
- Predecessor: Augustin Farah
- Successor: Issam John Darwich

Orders
- Ordination: 13 June 1954
- Consecration: 7 August 1983 by Maximos V Hakim

Personal details
- Born: 20 September 1930 Roum, Mandatory Lebanese Republic
- Died: 13 December 2017 (aged 87)

André Haddad, BS (20 September 1930 in Roum, Lebanon – 13 December 2017) was an archbishop of the Melkite Greek Catholic Archeparchy of Zahle and Forzol.

== Ecclesiastical career ==
On June 13, 1954, Andre Haddad was ordained to the priesthood and appointed Chaplain of the Melkite Basilians of the Most Holy Redeemer. He was appointed and consecrated on 14 June 1983 as Archbishop of Zahle and Furzol succeeding Augustin Farah. The Patriarch of Antioch Maximos V Hakim ordained him bishop on August 7, 1983, and his co-consecrators were the archbishops Nicolas Hajj, SDS, of Banyas and Saba Youakim, BS, of Petra and Philadelphia. Archbishop Andre Haddad assisted as co-consecrator of the following bishops:

- Archbishop Abraham Nehmé of Homs in Syria
- Archbishop Georges El-Murr, BC, of Petra and Philadelphia in Jordan
- Bishop Issam John Darwich, BC, from Sydney in Australia
- Archbishop Joseph Kallas, SMSP, of Beirut and Byblos in Lebanon
- Archbishop Georges Nicholas Haddad, Titular Bishop of Myra of Greek Melkites (Apostolic Exarch of Argentina)

In October 2010 he was a participant in the Special Assembly of the Synod of Bishops in the Middle East. On 24 June 2010 Haddad submitted his resignation due to age.

He died on 13 December 2017.

== Political interference ==
Charges of corruption and mismanagement of the government in Lebanon caused Haddad excitement in 2002. He extended his allegation that denounced the waste of public money and accused government officials of using money for personal reasons and private greed.
