= Melkite Greek Catholic Archeparchy of Homs =

Eastern Catholic archeparchy in Syria

Coordinates: 34.7333°N 36.7167°E

Archeparchy of Homs (Melkite Greek) Archeparchy Hemesena Graecorum Melkitarum-Epiphaniensis-Iabrudensis

Location
- Country: Syria

Statistics
- Population: (as of 2010); 30,000
- Parishes: 21

Information
- Denomination: Melkite Greek Catholic Church
- Rite: Byzantine Rite
- Established: 1849
- Cathedral: Our Lady of Peace Cathedral

Current leadership
- Pope: Leo XIV
- Patriarch: Youssef Absi
- Archeparch: Jean-Abdo Arbach
- Bishops emeritus: Isidore Battikha

Melkite Greek Catholic Archeparchy of Homs (in Latin: Archeparchy Hemesena Graecorum Melkitarum-Epiphaniensis-Iabrudensis) is a nominally Metropolitan Archeparchy (Eastern Catholic archdiocese) of the Melkite Greek Catholic Church (Byzantine Rite, Arabic) in central Syria. It was established on March 4, 1849 and has no suffragan, but two merged-in eparchial titles.

== Territory and statistics ==
The archeparchy extends in the central part of Syria, corresponding roughly to the Hama Governorate and Homs Governorate.

Its archeparchial see is the city of Homs, where is located the Cathedral of Our Lady of Peace. In Yabrud is located the co-cathedral of Saints Constantine and Helen.

It is currently governed by Archeparch Jean-Abdo Arbach, B.C.

The territory is divided into 21 parishes and there were 30,000 Melkite Catholics in 2010.

== History ==
The archeparchy consists of territories that were once three separate ecclesiastical entities: Homs, Hama and Yabrud.

When in 1724 the Melkite Greek Catholic Church was established, the three eparchies started gradually merged.

The union ultimately came during the patriarchate of Maximos III Mazloum and was contextually erected from eparchy of Homs to Metropolitan Archeparchy on March 4, 1849, as the titles of the Melkite Catholic Archeparchy of Hama and Melkite Catholic Eparchy of Jabrud were formally united with the new Metropolitanate.

== Episcopal ordinaries ==
Metropolitan Archeparchs of Homs

- Ignace (mentioned in 1759)
- Jéremie (mentioned in 1790)
- Gregory Atta (February 20, 1849 - December 3, 1899 deceased)
- Flavien Khoury (November 21, 1901 - 1920 resigned), Titular Archbishop of Palmyra of the Greek-Melkites (1920 – ?)
- Basil Khoury (November 20, 1920 - October 25, 1938 deceased), Titular Archbishop of Sergiopolis (1938.10.15 – death 1941.11.21)
- Athanasios Toutoungi (October 1, 1938 - December 5, 1961), previously Superior General of Basilian Alepian Order (B.A.) (1934 – 1940); later Metropolitan Archeparch of Aleppo of the Greek-Melkites (Syria) (1961.12.05 – 1968.03.06), Titular Archbishop of Tarsus of the Greek-Melkites (1968.03.06 – death 1981.02.20)
- Jean Bassoul, Basilian Salvatorian fathers (B.S.) (December 5, 1961 - August 21, 1971), later Archeparch of Zahle and Forzol of the Greek-Melkites (Lebanon) (1971.08.21 – 1977.08.09)
- Denys Gaith, Basilian Chouerite Order of Saint John the Baptist (B.C.) (August 21, 1971 - March 22, 1986 deceased)
- Abraham Nehmé, B.C. (August 20, 1986 - June 20, 2005 withdrawn)
- Isidore Battikha, B.A. (February 9, 2006 - September 6, 2010 resigned), previously Archbishop of Pelusium of the Greek-Melkites (1992.08.25 – 2006.02.09), Auxiliary Bishop of Antioch of the Greek-Melkites (Syria) (1992.08.25 – 2006.02.09)
- Jean-Abdo Arbach, B.C., (June 23, 2012 - ), previously Titular Bishop of Hilta (2006.10.17 – 2006.11.11), Apostolic Exarch of Argentina of the Greek-Melkites (2006.10.17 – 2012.06.23), Titular Bishop of Palmyra of the Greek-Melkites (2006.11.11 – 2012.06.23)

== Sources and external links ==
- GigaCatholic with incumbent biography links
- http://www.catholic-hierarchy.org/diocese/dhomm.html
- http://www.pgc-lb.org/fre/melkite_greek_catholic_church/Metropole-of-Homs-Hama-and-Yabroud
- https://web.archive.org/web/20120419194326/http://www.pgc-lb.org/english/Church3.shtml#Homs
