= Caritas Jerusalem =

Catholic charity organization

- Established: 1967
- Type: Nonprofit
- Headquarters: Paratroopers Road
- Coordinates: 31.77996°N 35.22595°E
- Origins: Catholic Social Teaching
- Region served: Palestine
- Fields: social work
- Secretary General: Anton Asfar
- Affiliations: Caritas MONA, Caritas Internationalis
- Website: caritasjr.org

Caritas Jerusalem (Arabic: مؤسسة كاريتاس القدس, Hebrew: קריטס ירושלים) is a Catholic nonprofit organisation based in Jerusalem and operating mainly in Palestine. It was established in 1967 and is the official aid organisation of the Catholic Church in Palestine and in Israel. The organisation refers to the territories it is working in as the "Holy Land".

Caritas Jerusalem implements social welfare services and provides humanitarian aid. It is a member of both Caritas Internationalis and Caritas MONA.

== Background ==
Caritas Jerusalem was founded in 1967 after the Six-Day War to coordinate Catholic relief efforts.

In 2022, Caritas Jerusalem's activities included the renovation of houses, distribution of food kits, integration activities for persons with disabilities, labour market integration activities for women and youth, healthcare and health promotion activities, as well as other support to vulnerable groups. These activities took place in the West Bank, Gaza and East Jerusalem.

During the Gaza humanitarian crisis, Caritas Jerusalem set up a temporary clinic in the north of the territory in February 2024 and eight mobile clinics for the displaced persons in Rafah. Israeli airstrikes killed a lab technician and a pharmacist working for Caritas Jerusalem in October and November 2023.

== Governance ==
=== Presidents ===
- around 2006: Michel Sabbah
- around 2010: Fouad Twal
- currently: Pierbattista Pizzaballa

=== Secretaries General ===
- 1987–2013: Claudette Habesch
- 2013–2017: Fr. Raed Abusahlia
- 2017–2022: Sr. Bridget Tighe
- 2022–present: Anton Asfar
