= Sleiman Hajjar =

Sleiman Hajjar BS
- Eparch of Saint-Sauveur of Montréal
- Native name: سليمان حجار
- Church: Melkite Greek Catholic Church
- Diocese: Melkite Greek Catholic Eparchy of Saint-Sauveur of Montréal
- In office: July 10, 1998 – March 10, 2002
- Predecessor: Michel Hakim
- Successor: Ibrahim Ibrahim

Orders
- Ordination: 4 August 1979
- Consecration: 6 August 1998 by Maximos V Hakim

Personal details
- Born: May 13, 1950 Jezzine, South Governorate, Lebanon
- Died: March 10, 2002 (aged 51) Fort Lauderdale, Florida, United States

Sleiman Hajjar (May 13, 1950 — March 10, 2002) was the Melkite Catholic bishop of Canada. Hajjar was born in Jezzine, Lebanon and graduated from St. Joseph University and from the Pontifical University of the Holy Spirit in Lebanon. Ordained a priest on August 4, 1979, he served in Lebanon before coming to Canada in 1995 and was posted to Saints Peter and Paul Parish in Ottawa. He was consecrated a bishop in 1998 and served as eparch for the 40,000 Melkite Catholics in Canada. He was considered a dynamic pastor and was particularly known for his work with youth, both in Lebanon and in Canada. While in Lebanon Hajjar established a variety of humanitarian relief efforts focused on helping children caught in the upheaval of the Lebanese civil war.

Hajjar died of a heart attack while on holiday in Florida. He was succeeded as bishop by Ibrahim Ibrahim.
