= Ablah, Lebanon =

Ablah أبلح
- Village
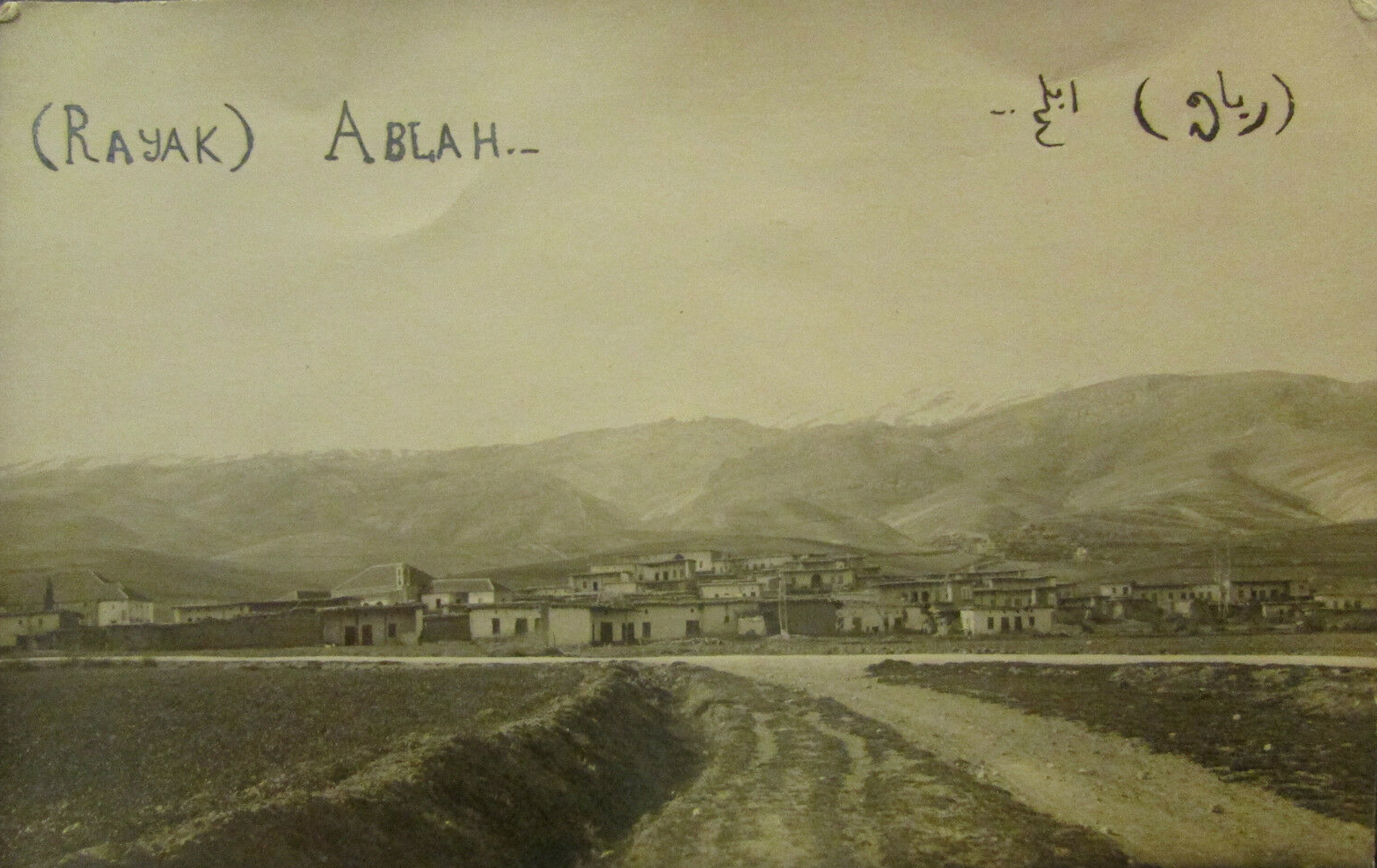
- Ablah, ca 1925

- Location in Lebanon
- Coordinates: 33°52′10″N 35°57′52″E
- Country: Lebanon
- Governorate: Beqaa Governorate
- District: Zahlé
- Elevation: 3,150 ft (960 m)
- Time zone: UTC+2 (EET)
  - Summer (DST): +3

Ablah (Arabic: أبلح, romanized: ʾAblāḥ) is a village located in the Zahlé District of the Beqaa Governorate in Lebanon.

== History ==
In 1838, Eli Smith noted Ablah's population being Catholics.

== Bibliography ==
- Robinson, E.; Smith, E. (1841). Biblical Researches in Palestine, Mount Sinai and Arabia Petraea: A Journal of Travels in the year 1838. Vol. 3. Boston: Crocker & Brewster.
