= Melkite Greek Catholic Archeparchy of Zahle and Forzol =

Eastern Catholic archeparchy in Lebanon

Coordinates: 33.8333°N 35.9000°E

Archeparchy of Zahle and Forzol (Melkite Greek) Mariamnensis Graecorum Melkitarum

Location
- Country: Lebanon

Statistics
- Population: (as of 2012); 150,000
- Parishes: 39

Information
- Denomination: Melkite Greek Catholic Church
- Rite: Byzantine Rite
- Established: 1964
- Cathedral: Our Lady of Liberation Cathedral

Current leadership
- Pope: Leo XIV
- Patriarch: Youssef Absi
- Archeparch: Ibrahim M. Ibrahim

Melkite Greek Catholic Archeparchy of Zahle and Forzol (in Latin: Mariamnensis Graecorum Melkitarum) is a diocese of the Melkite Greek Catholic Church.

In 2012 there were 150,000 baptized. It is currently governed by Archeparch Ibrahim M. Ibrahim, BS.

== Territory and statistics ==
The archeparchy includes most of the Beqaa Valley in Lebanon. Its archeparchial seat is the city of Zahleh, where is located the Cathedral of Our Lady of Deliverance, built in the 18th century. The territory is divided into 39 parishes and there were 150,000 Melkite Catholics in 2012.

== History ==
The Archeparchy of Zahle and Forzol is a Greco-Melchite archeparchy in the Beqaa Valley, Lebanon and has its origins in the 5th century. In the seventeenth, or perhaps in the 16th century, the diocese of Seleucia Pieria was for greater safety transferred by the Patriarch of Antioch to Maaloula in the Lebanon. The reason of this transfer was forgotten at a later date, and a town of "Seleucia Libani" was invented and identified with Maaloula, though such a town never existed.

When the see was transferred from Maaloula to Forzol, the title of Seleucia accompanied it. The Archeparchy of Zahle and Forzol has been in communion with Rome since 1724, when the bishop Efthymios Fadel Maalouly proclaimed its union with the Holy See, thus “leaving the fold” of the Greek Orthodox Church of Antioch. In 1727, the headquarters was moved to Zahle, which became the capital of the region of the Bekaa, but it was only a nominal measure. The transfer had already taken place in 1760, for the Catholic titular Euthymius Fadel of Malouli then signed as Bishop of Forzol and Beqaa. In 1774, the headquarters of the eparchy was moved permanently to Zahleh.

In October 1790, a Catholic bishop of Zahlé assisted at a council held in the Convent of Saint-Sauveur. The Diocese of Zahle is identical with that of Forzol, under which name it often appears. Since the 1849 Council of Jerusalem, the bishop bears the titles of Forzol, Zahle, and Beqaa. Since 1768 his residence has been at Zahle.

In the Greek Orthodox Church of Antioch the bishop always bears the title of Seleucia. Zahle itself dates only from the end of the seventeenth century, when Catholics fled thither in great numbers, the locality being under the protection of the emirs of Lebanese, by whom they were protected from Greek Orthodox Church of Antioch and from the Muslims.

Gradually the place grew larger; as of 1913 it was a city of about 20,000 inhabitants, nearly all Melkite Greek Catholics. In 1860 the Druzes destroyed 2000 houses, and several Christians were massacred, among them four Jesuits. There are to-day a Jesuit residence and a school, similarly a residence and a school in the Molallaqa quarter.

The diocese comprises 30,000 Catholics, forty seven priests, thirty three churches and chapels, nine primary schools, three convents of Salvatorians, Alepins, and of Chouerites, with forty three religious.

On 18 November 1964, Pope Paul VI elevated the eparchy to the rank of archeparchy.

== Bishops ==
- Efthymios Fadel Maalouly (1 October 1724 - 1775; resigned)
- Youssef Farhat (1775 - 1793)
- Basile Jabaly (1796 - 1811)
- Macarius IV Tawil, BS (1811 - 10 December 1813; elected Melkite Patriarch of Antioch)
- Ignace Ajoury (1816 - 1834)
- Basile Schajat (Shahiat), BS (15 October 1834 - 1864)
- Ambroise Abdo (15 November 1866 - 1875; resigned and appointed Patriarchal Vicar of Jerusalem)
- Meletios Fakak (consecrated 23 January 1876 - 16 August 1881 appointed archeparch of Beirut and Byblos)
- Ignace Malluk (Malouk) (18 September 1881 - 1898)
- Cyril IX Moghabghab (23 April 1899 - 21 June 1926; confirmed Melkite Patriarch of Antioch)

=== Archbishops ===
- Eftimios Youakim (30 October 1926 - 21 August 1971; withdrawn)
- Jean Bassoul (21 August 1971 - 9 August 1977; deceased)
- Augustin Farah (25 August 1977 - 31 March 1983; deceased)
- André Haddad, BS (14 June 1983 - 15 June 2011; resigned)
- Issam John Darwich, BS (15 June 2011 – 26 June 2021; resigned)
- Ibrahim M. Ibrahim (26 June 2021 – present)
