= Ibrahim Ibrahim (bishop) =

Ibrahim Michael Ibrahim BS
- Archeparch of Zahle and Forzol
- Native name: إبراهيم مايكل إبراهيم
- Church: Melkite Greek Catholic Church
- Archdiocese: Melkite Greek Catholic Archeparchy of Zahle and Forzol
- Installed: 18 December 2021
- Predecessor: Issam John Darwich
- Previous post: Eparch of Saint-Sauveur of Montréal (2003-2021)

Orders
- Ordination: 18 July 1987
- Consecration: 17 August 2003 by Gregory III Laham

Personal details
- Born: March 22, 1962 (age 64) Jensnaya, South Governorate, Lebanon

Ibrahim Michael Ibrahim, BS (born March 22, 1962) is the current archbishop of Zahleh and Furzol of the Melkite Greek Catholic Church in Lebanon. He was previously the eparch of the Eparchy of Saint-Sauveur de Montréal in Canada, the spiritual leader of the 43,000 Melkites in Canada.

== Biography ==
Ibrahim was born in Jinsnaya, Lebanon, on March 22, 1962, and he was ordained a priest on July 18, 1987.

Prior to his consecration as bishop, he served as pastor of St Elias Church in Cleveland, Ohio, protopresbyter for the Great Lakes region in the United States and regional superior of the Basilian Salvatorian Order.

=== Episcopacy ===
He was elected bishop by the Melkite synod and patriarch on June 18, 2003, following the death of Bishop Sleiman Hajjar. Ibrahim was consecrated bishop and enthroned as eparch on August 17, 2003.

In June 2021, he became Archbishop of Zahleh and Furzol of the Greek Melkites in Lebanon.
