= Basile Khoury =

Basile Khoury BS
- Archeparch of Sidon
- Native name: باسيل خورى
- Church: Melkite Greek Catholic Church
- Archdiocese: Melkite Greek Catholic Archeparchy of Sidon
- In office: 15 March 1947 – 25 August 1977
- Predecessor: Gabriele (Nicola) Nabaa
- Successor: Michel Hakim
- Other post: Titular Archbishop of Myra dei Greco-Melkiti (1977-1985)

Orders
- Ordination: 2 May 1928
- Consecration: 25 March 1947 by Cyril IX Moghabghab

Personal details
- Born: 15 August 1900 Safita, Beirut vilayet, Ottoman Empire
- Died: 22 April 1985 (aged 84)

Basile Khoury, BS (15 August 1900, Borj-Safita, today Syria – 22 April 1985) was the first Archeparch of the Melkite Greek Catholic Archeparchy of Sidon in Lebanon.

== Life ==
Basile Khoury was ordained priest on May 2, 1928 and became Chaplain of the Melkite Basilian from the Holy Redeemer (BS). He was named to the Eparchy of Sidon, being appointed on 15 March 1947 at 25 March 1947 ordained to the episcopate. At the beginning of the 1960s during his tenure and under his patronage was erected a hexagonal chapel in Maghdouché, a Lebanese pilgrimage center, and this chapel had 28 meter high with a statue of "Our Lady of Mantara". Khoury was a Council Father during the first and second sessions of the Second Vatican Council (1962-1965).

On November 18, 1964, the Eparchy of Sidon was elevated to Archeparchy by Pope Paul VI and Khoury was appointed Archbishop of Sidon. On 30 July 1965 he was co-consecrator of the Archbishop Georges Haddad. On reaching the age limit, he was, at the same time appointed with 77 years on August 25, 1977 Titular Bishop of Myra of Greek Melkites and until his death on April 22, 1985 became Archbishop Emeritus of Sidon.
