= Saint Michael's School of Padada =

Roman Catholic school in Davao del Sur, Philippines

- Paaralang San Miguel ng Padada (Filipino)
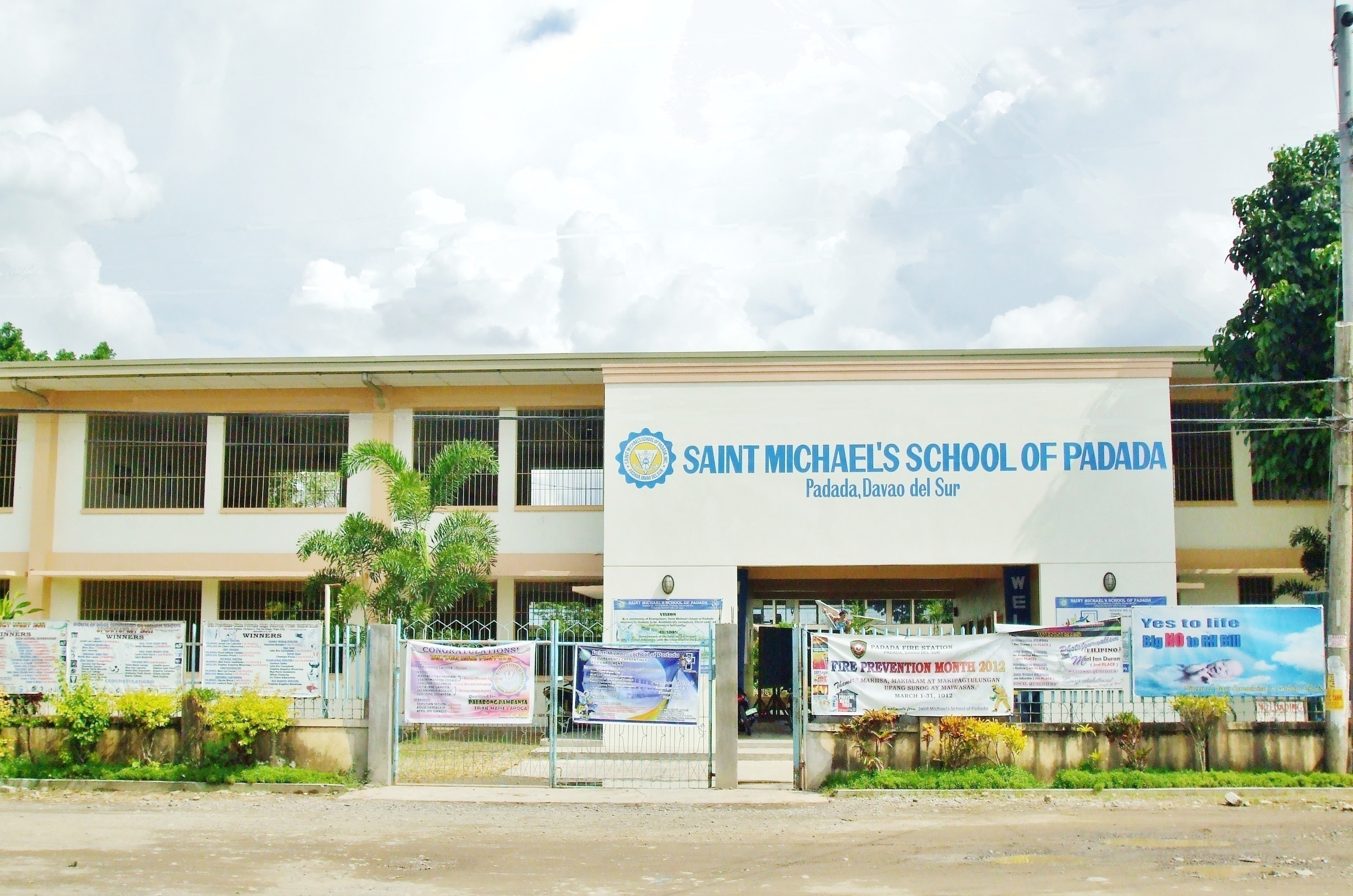
- Saint Michael's School of Padada northern façade

Location
- Quezon St., N.C. Ordaneza District, Padada, Davao del Sur; Philippines; 6°38′12″N 125°20′43″E

Information
- Former names: St. Michael's Academy; St. Michael's College
- Type: Private Catholic
- Religious affiliations: Roman Catholic (Sisters of the Presentation of Mary)
- Established: 1954; 72 years ago
- Founder: Missionary Sisters of the Immaculate Conception (MIC)
- Principal: Sr. Elnora R. Taparan, PM
- Campus: Padada, Davao del Sur
- Color: Blue - Sky blue - White
- Affiliation: Catholic Educational Association of the Philippines (CEAP)

Saint Michael's School of Padada also referred to by its acronym SMSP is a private Catholic basic education institution run by the Sisters of the Presentation of Mary in Padada, Davao del Sur, Philippines. The school was founded by the Missionary Sisters of the Immaculate Conception (MIC) in 1954. It focuses on the teaching of religion, the integration of faith in all subject areas, and provision for daily living of the faith within the school campus.

SMSP is a member of the Catholic Educational Association of the Philippines (CEAP), the largest organized group of Catholic schools in the country, with about 1,194 members as instituted in 1941.

== History ==
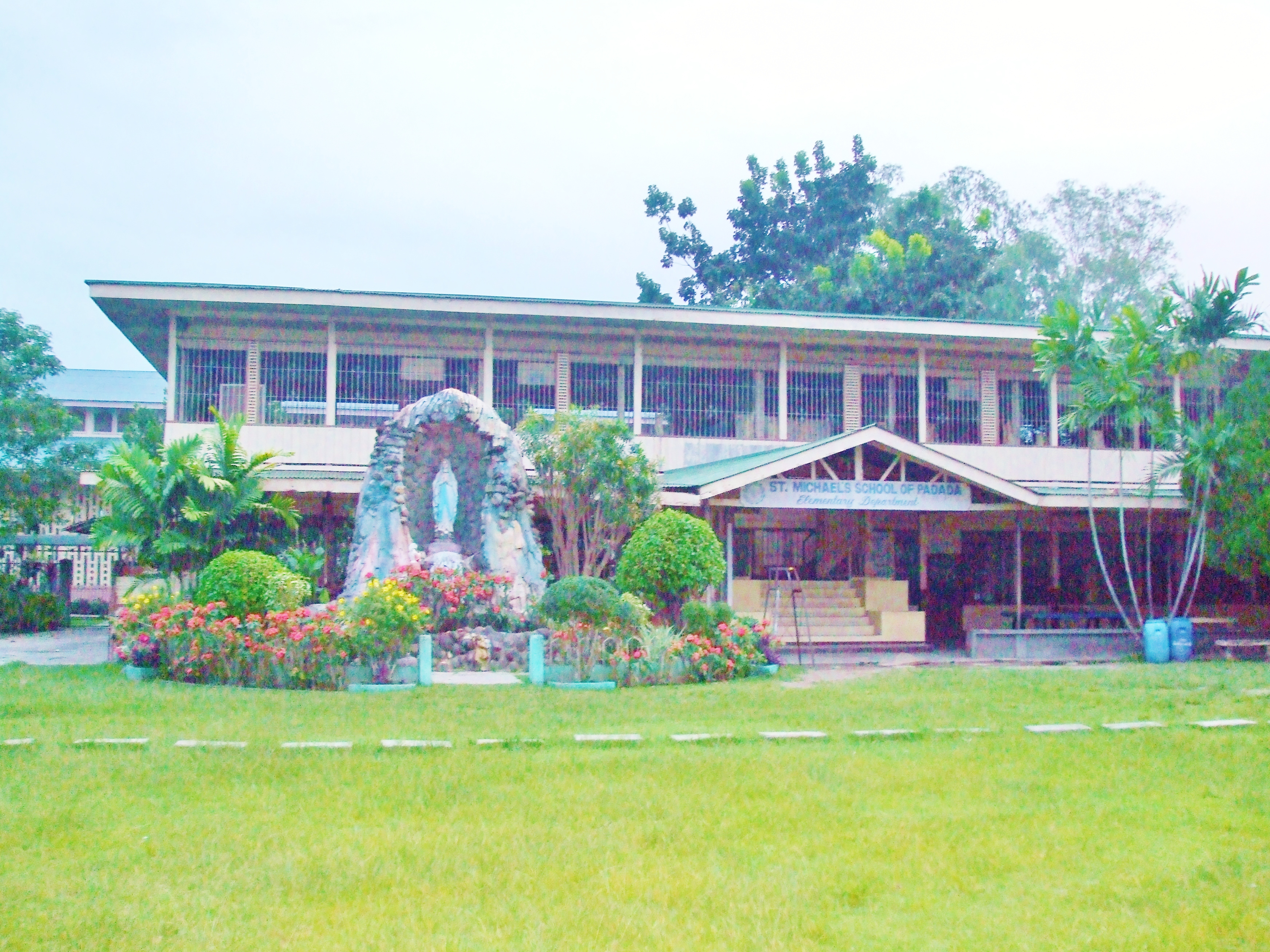
SMSP (Grotto)

In 1954, the Missionary Sisters of the Immaculate Conception (MIC) accepted the invitation of the late Most Reverend Clouis Thibault, P.M.E., then bishop of the prelature of Davao, to open a school in Padada, Davao del Sur.

Shortly after their arrival, the sisters started the construction of the school with the help of Father Paul Gravel, P.M.E., who was then the parish priest of the Padada. The school was formally opened in the school year 1954-1955. Sister Claire del Eucharistie, M.I.C., was the first directress, and Sister Genevieve St. Pierre, M.I.C., was her assistant.

The school changed names three times in its first 25 years. It was first known as St. Michael's Academy (SMA). When a college department was opened, it became St. Michael's College (SMC). When the college was phased out, it became Saint Michael's School of Padada (SMSP).

As in all religious institutions, the M.I.C sisters underwent a renewal program and re-evaluated their work in the Philippines. In 1980, the Sisters of the Presentation of Mary formally took over the administration of SMSP.

== School curriculum ==
As a Catholic School, SMSP aims to develop students in all aspects of their personality, physical, intellectual, cultural, emotional, moral and spiritual according to the teachings of Jesus Christ. As a Filipino School, the institution aims to inculcate love of country, duties of citizenship, and sincere appreciation of cultural heritage.

The academic program utilizes strategies geared to develop spiritual and social responsibilities. These include:

1. Contextualization of all academic courses within the needs of the Catholic church and the needs of society, including the social ills that beset the Philippines.
2. Discussion, evaluation of and reflection on students' experiences regarding their involvement in the church and in community activities and extra-curricular activities done within the academic program.
3. Values Education, which encompasses the endangered Filipino values, and which is integrated in all subjects.

== Location ==
SMSP is situated at Quezon St., N.C. Ordaneza District in Padada, Davao del Sur, with School ID no. 405404.
