= Caritas Lebanon =

Lebanese social welfare, humanitarian and development agency

- كاريتاس لبنان
- Established: 1976
- Type: Nonprofit
- Headquarters: Dr Youssef Hajjar Street, Sin el Fil
- Location: Beirut, Lebanon
- Coordinates: 33.86748°N 35.53905°E
- Origins: Catholic Social Teaching
- Region served: Lebanon
- Fields: social work, humanitarian aid, advocacy
- President: Fr. Michel Abboud
- Main organ: board of directors
- Affiliations: Caritas MONA, Caritas Internationalis
- Website: www.caritas.org.lb

Caritas Lebanon (Arabic: كاريتاس لبنان, French: Caritas Liban) is a Catholic Lebanese nonprofit organisation, established in 1976. It is the official aid organisation of the Catholic Church in Lebanon and implements social welfare services and provides humanitarian aid. It is one of the best-known and largest NGOs in the country and a member of Caritas Internationalis and Caritas MONA.

== Background ==
Caritas Lebanon's predecessor was established in 1972 by Elie Mamery, a Lebanese Jesuit in Sidon in the south of the country. The initial activities included distribution of primary care items, such as medicines and clothes to families in need in the bordering villages. In the following years, the organisation opened social centres, medical centres and mobile clinics, which became even more important with the outbreak of the Lebanese Civil War (1975–1990) and the displacement of people it provoked.

In 1976, the organisation took its current name and the bishops and patriarchs of the Catholic Church in Lebanon formally recognized Caritas as the socio-pastoral organ of the Church in Lebanon.

Caritas Lebanon's network of 60 health and social centres spans across a large part of the country, providing services to both the local population and refugees alike. In addition, its mobile clinics travel up and down the country, especially in rural areas.

Since the 1990s, Caritas Lebanon has also specialised on supporting migrants and advocating for migrant rights within Lebanon. The Caritas Lebanon Migrant Center (CLMC) assists thousands of migrants every year through services such as psychosocial support, counselling, social assistance, medical aid, legal aid, training, and shelter.

Following the Lebanese liquidity crisis and the subsequent economic downturn, there has been a significant rise in the number of individuals seeking assistance from Caritas.
