= Pierre Kamel Medawar =

Pierre Kamel Medawar, SMSP (26 December 1887, in Haifa, Israel – 27 April 1985) was auxiliary bishop in the Melkite Patriarchate of Antioch.

== Life ==
On August 15, 1938, he received the ordination to the priesthood in the Missionary Society of St Paul. On 13 March 1943, he was appointed Auxiliary Bishop of Antioch and Titular Bishop of Pelusium of Greek Melkites. The ordination as bishop was held on June 6, 1943. In 1969 he retired due to age-related reasons and became emeritus Auxiliary Bishop of Antioch until his death on April 27, 1985. He was a participant at the fourth session of the Second Vatican Council and assisted as co-consecrator at the consecration of bishops Maximos V Hakim, Elias Zoghby, Joseph Tawil and Nicolas Hajj, SDS.
