= Caritas Middle East and North Africa =

Catholic charity confederation

- Abbreviation: Caritas MONA
- Location: Beirut, Lebanon
- Coordinates: 33.89966°N 35.57333°E
- Origins: Catholic Social Teaching
- Region served: Middle East and North Africa, Horn of Africa, Cyprus
- Fields: development aid, humanitarian aid, social services
- President: Gabriel Hatti
- Parent organization: Caritas Internationalis

Caritas Middle East and North Africa (French: Caritas Moyen-Orient et Afrique du Nord), also known as Caritas MONA, is a Catholic charity network active in the Middle East and North Africa and in the Horn of Africa. It is one of the seven regions of the worldwide Caritas Internationalis confederation.

The name Caritas MONA refers both to the regional secretariat, based in Lebanon, and the network of 15 member organisations.

== Work ==
The work of Caritas MONA's secretariat involves coordinating responses from its member organisations to disasters and humanitarian emergencies within the confederation, as well as providing technical support and capacity-building through training initiatives, among other to ensure compliance with Caritas Internationalis Management Standards. Additionally, Caritas MONA engages in advocacy efforts, such as addressing violence in Iraq in 2008, the 2020 Beirut explosion, and calling for a ceasefire in the Gaza humanitarian crisis in 2023.

The member organisations are active in a broad range of sectors in their respective countries, including in healthcare, education, social service provision and humanitarian aid.

== Membership ==
Caritas MONA consists of 15 national member organisations. They are located in the Maghreb and the Mashriq region, as well as in the Horn of Africa. The Caritas MONA member organisations that are located on the African continent are exclusively members of Caritas MONA; they are not also members of Caritas Africa.

Despite being located in an EU member state, Caritas Cyprus is also a member of Caritas MONA. The national Caritas working in Israel and Palestine is Caritas Jerusalem.

=== List of Member Organisations ===
Country	Member organisation (English name)	Established
Algeria	Caritas Algeria	1962
Cyprus	Caritas Cyprus	1974
Djibouti	Caritas Djibouti	1978
Egypt	Caritas Egypt	1967
Iraq	Caritas Iraq	1981
Iran	Caritas Iran	1992
Holy Land	Caritas Jerusalem	1967
Jordan	Caritas Jordan	1967
Lebanon	Caritas Lebanon	1976
Libya	Caritas Libya	?
Mauritania	Caritas Mauritania	1972
Morocco	Caritas Morocco	1947
Somalia	Caritas Somalia	1980
Syria	Caritas Syria	1954
Tunisia	Caritas Tunisia	?

== Leadership ==
=== Presidents ===
- 1999–2007: Claudette Habesch
- 2008–2016: Joseph Farah
- 2016–present: Gabriel Hatti

=== Regional Coordinators ===
- ?–2017: Rosette Hechaime
- 2017–present: Karam Abi Yazbeck
