= Georges El-Murr =

- Archbishop of Petra and Philadelphia
- Previous posts: Archbishop of Petra and Philadelphia (1992-2007)

Orders
- Ordination: 27 July 1958
- Consecration: 23 October 1992 by Maximos V Hakim

Personal details
- Born: 11 October 1930 Ka'a at Baalbek, Lebanon
- Died: 8 February 2017 (aged 86)
- Denomination: Melkite Greek Catholic Church

Georges El-Murr, BC (11 October 1930 in Ka'a at Baalbek, Lebanon – 8 February 2017) was Archbishop of the Melkite Greek Catholic Archeparchy of Petra and Philadelphia in Amman.

== Life ==
Georges El-Murr was ordained a priest of the Order of St. John S. Ordo Basilianus Baptistae, Soaritarum Melkitarum (religious symbol: BC) on 27 July 1958. He was appointed vicar for the District of Irbid in 1968 and moved in 1991 to Newton (USA). His appointment as Archbishop of Petra and Philadelphia on August 26, 1992, made him successor to Archbishop Saba Youakim. On 23 October 1992, he was ordained in Amman by Melkite Patriarch Maximos V Hakim Archbishop, and he had as co-consecrators Archbishops Andre Haddad, BS of Zahle and Furzol (Lebanon) and Abraham Nehmé of Homs (Syria).

El-Murr consecrated as Archbishop Elias Chacour Archbishop of Akka (Israel) and was co-consecrator at Georges Nicolas Haddad, SMSP, Exarch of Argentina, Bishop Abdo Arbach Exarch of Argentina and its eventual successor Archbishop Yasser Ayyash. In addition to office he was from 1997 to 2007 Patriarchal Exarch of the Melkite Greek Catholic Church in Iraq. After his renounce El-Murr is emeritus since June 18, 2007.

== Political arrangement ==
For political issues the Archbishop made in 2002 a discourse when he called for diplomatic and economic sanctions against Israel by the United States and the European Union. He protested against the so ongoing armed conflict in Palestine and called on Israel to withdraw.

"As long as the United States speak empty words and hollow threats, they are in the conflict on the part of Israel," said El-Murr. Neither the EU nor the US has done in his opinion in the past enough to avoid the conflict. In former Yugoslavia or Iraq and Afghanistan, the international community has mixed in Israel but let one grant."
