= Michel Hakim =

Michel Hakim BS
- (Arch)Eparch of Saint-Sauveur of Montréal
- Native name: ميشيل حكيم
- Church: Melkite Greek Catholic Church
- Diocese: Melkite Greek Catholic Eparchy of Saint-Sauveur of Montréal
- In office: 1 September 1984 – 30 June 1998
- Predecessor: Himself (as Apostolic Exarch)
- Successor: Sleiman Hajjar
- Previous posts: Apostolic Exarch Canada (1980-1984); Titular Archbishop of Caesarea in Cappadocia dei Greco-Melkiti (1980-1984); Archeparch of Sidon (1977-1980)

Orders
- Ordination: 10 November 1947 by Maximos IV Sayegh
- Consecration: 10 September 1977 by Maximos V Hakim

Personal details
- Born: 21 April 1921 Maghdouché, Mandatory Greater Lebanon
- Died: 22 November 2006 (aged 85) Montreal, Quebec, Canada

Michel Hakim, BS (21 April 1921 in Maghdouché, Lebanon – 22 November 2006 in Montreal, Canada) was Vicar Apostolic of Canada and first bishop of the Melkite Greek Catholic Eparchy of Saint-Sauveur in Montréal in Canada.

== Life ==
Michel Hakim was born in Maghdouché, Lebanon, to Greek Catholic parents, Nakhleh Hakim and Hanneh Hayek. His hometown, Maghdouché, is a well-known pilgrimage center, under the administration of the Melkite Greek Catholic Church. Hakim studied at St.-Sauveur seminary theology and was on November 10, 1947 ordained priest as Chaplain of the Melkite Basilian of the Most Holy Redeemer (BS). He worked as a school administrator in Damascus and later led a youth group in Zahle. In the 60s, Hakim completed his theological studies at the Sorbonne and the Institut Catholique de Paris. Since 1947 he was Superior of the Basilian Order.

On August 25, 1977, he was appointed bishop of the Melkite Greek Catholic Archeparchy of Sidon in Lebanon. The episcopal ordination was on September 10, 1977 by the Patriarch of Antioch Maximos V Hakim. His co-consecrators were the Archbishops Saba Youakim of Petra and Philadelphia in Jordan and Georges Haddad of Tyre in Lebanon.

Pope John Paul II named Hakim on 13 October 1980 to the Apostolic Vicariate of Canada for the Melkite Greek Catholic Church and at the same time appointed him Titular Bishop of Caesarea in Cappadocia of Greek Melkites. On 1 September 1984, after the nomination of the Apostolic Vicariate to Archeparchy, he was appointed Archbishop of Saint-Sauveur de Montréal. Hakim was co-consecrator of the bishops John Elya (Newton, USA), Nicholas Samra (Auxiliary bishop in Newton) and Sleiman Hajjar, BS, his successor in office. After his age-related retirement on 30 June 1998 retired Archbishop Hakim remained between Montreal and Lebanon.
