= Synod of Qarqafe =

- Date: 1806
- Location: Monastery of St. Anthony of Qarqafe, Beirut, Lebanon
- Convoked by: Germanos Adam
- President: Agapius II Matar
- Attendance: Nine bishops, two priests, two religious superiors
- Topics: Church reform, adaptation of the Synod of Pistoia
- Accepted by: Melkite Greek Catholic Church from 1806–1835
- Disputed by: Pope Gregory XVI and the Roman Catholic Church; Joseph Tyan and the Maronite Catholic Church

The Synod of Qarqafe was a council of the Melkite Greek Catholic Church held in 1806. The synod adapted and ratified propositions of the 1786 Synod of Pistoia. It would be formally condemned in 1835 by Pope Gregory XVI in the bull Melchitarum Catholicorum Synodus.

== History ==
The Synod of Qarqafe was convoked by Germanos Adam, the Melkite Archbishop of Aleppo. Adam was educated at the College of the Propaganda in Rome and a friend of Scipione de' Ricci, by whom he was introduced to Gallican and Jansenist ideas. As archbishop, Adam began issuing pamphlets affirming Gallican propositions on the authority of the Pope and conciliarism. Despite being criticized by Pope Pius VII and Maronite patriarch Joseph Tyan, he was defended by his own patriarch, Agapius II Matar. Adam would ultimately be forced to recant these propositions and accept the bull Auctorem fidei before his death in 1809.

The Synod of Qarqafe began on 23 July 1806 at the Monastery of Saint Anthony in Qarqafe, in the Diocese of Beirut. It was attended by bishops Basil of Tyre, Athanasius Matar of Sidon (the brother of the patriarch), Makarios of Acre, Agapios Kanyar of Diyarbakir (Amid), Basil Jabali of Ferzol (Beqaa Valley), Joseph of Homs, and Benediktos of Baalbek. Two priests, George Nassar of Egypt and Michael Mazloum were present, and the acts were signed by Macarios Tawil and Ignatius Arkache, superior generals of local religious orders. The acts of the synod were formally approved by Joseph Tyan and the Roman apostolic visitor Luigi Gandolfi.

Roman interventions between 1812 and 1835 led to the condemnation of the works of Germanos Adam, the recanting of the propositions of the synod by most of the synod fathers, and the final condemnation of the synod by Pope Gregory XVI.

== Decrees ==
The Acts of the Synod of Qarqafe are divided into three sections and issued over one hundred canons dealing with the topics of ecclesial discipline, sacraments, and the ecclesial hierarchy.

== Legacy ==
Pope Pius IX issued the encyclical Quartus Supra in 1873 to the Armenian Catholic Church, accusing the Armenian Catholic bishops who opposed his intervention in their hierarchy of adhering to the Synod of Qarqafe. Melkite patriarch Gregory II Youssef, an opponent of Pius IX at the First Vatican Council, issued a negative response to the encyclical.

Serge Descy argues that despite the influence of the Synod of Pistoia, the Synod of Qarqafe is essentially a retrieval of traditional Eastern Christian ecclesiology.
