= Jean-Clément Jeanbart =

Syrian Melkite Catholic hierarch (1943–2026)

- Archeparch Emeritus of Aleppo
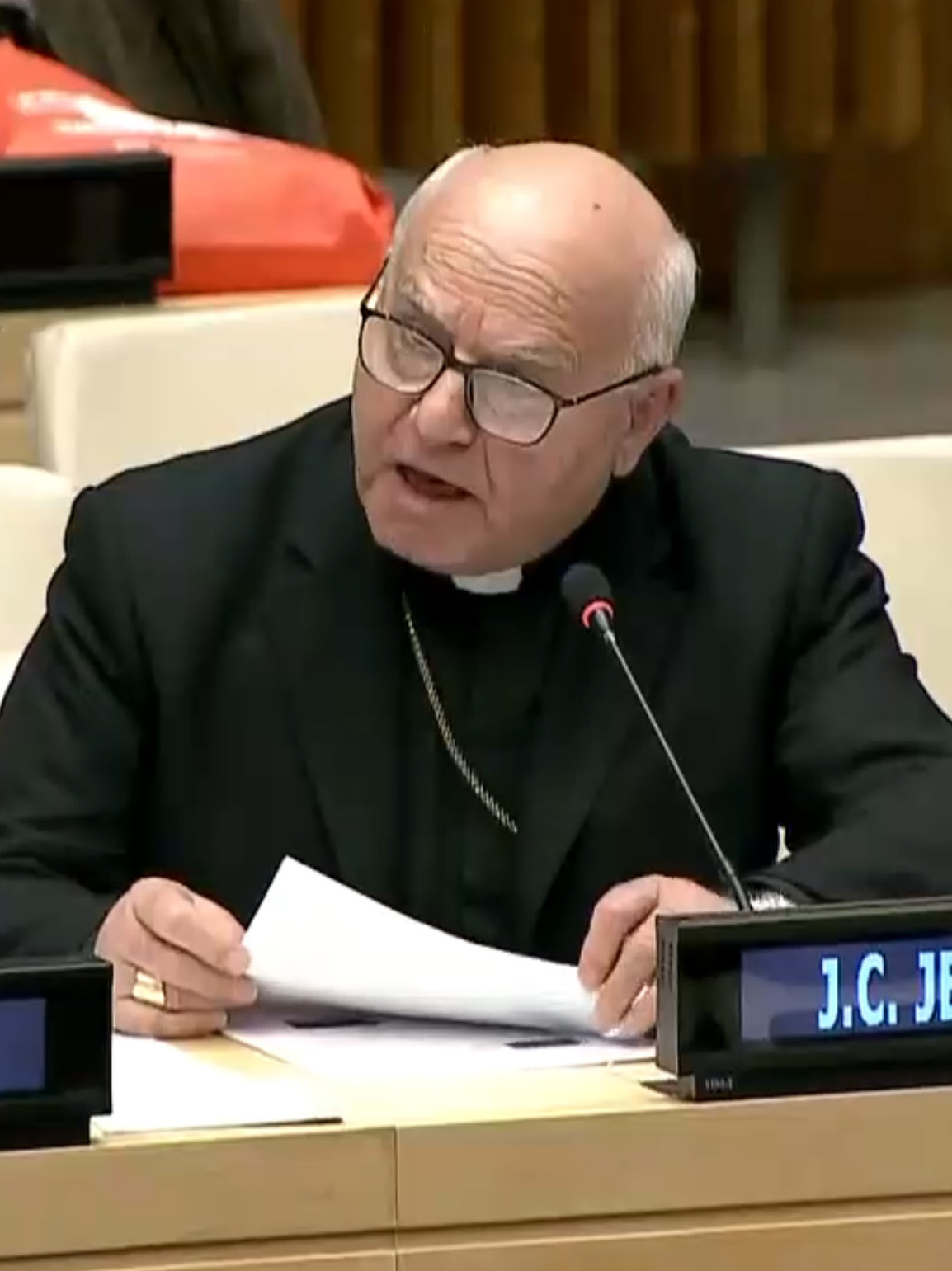
- Jeanbart in 2016
- Church: Melkite Greek Catholic Church
- Archdiocese: Melkite Greek Catholic Archeparchy of Aleppo
- Installed: 2 August 1995
- Term ended: 23 June 2021
- Predecessor: Néophytos Edelby
- Successor: Georges Masri
- Other post: Administrator of Antioch (2017)

Orders
- Ordination: 15 April 1968 by Néophytos Edelby
- Consecration: 16 September 1995 by Maximos V Hakim, François Abou Mokh and Habib Bacha

Personal details
- Born: 3 March 1943 Aleppo, Mandate for Syria and the Lebanon
- Died: 9 May 2026 (aged 83) Paris, France

Jean-Clément Jeanbart (3 March 1943 – 9 May 2026) was a Syrian Melkite Catholic hierarch, who served as the Archeparch of the Melkite Greek Catholic Archeparchy of Aleppo from 1995 until 2021 and Apostolic Visitor in Western Europe of the Greek Melkites.

== Biography ==
Jeanbart was born in Aleppo, Syria on 3 March 1943. He was the sixth of 12 children of a devout Melkite Catholic family. He first entered the seminary aged 11, but left to continue his studies in Aleppo. He returned aged 19 and was ordained to the priesthood on 15 April 1968 for his native Archeparchy of Aleppo. He was appointed to succeed the deceased Néophytos Edelby as Archbishop of Aleppo on 2 August 1995. The Patriarch of Antioch Maximos V Hakim ordained him to the episcopacy on 16 September 1995, assisted by co-consecrators, Archbishops François Abou Mokh BS and Habib Bacha SMSP. Jeanbart was appointed Apostolic Visitor in Western Europe of the Greek Melkites in 1999. He served as a principal co-consecrator for the consecration of Archbishop Nikolaki Sawaf of Latakia on 4 March 2000. After the outbreak of Syrian Civil War in Syria in August 2012, his residence was in Aleppo, but he refused to leave Syria.

In October 2015, he pleaded with the British government to stop backing opposition forces in the Syrian Civil War. He stated that the war was "a contest between a modern secular state and jihadis who were destroying its culture and massacring religious minorities."

When Patriarch Gregory III Laham resigned on 6 May 2017, Jeanbart became administrator of the Melkite Greek Catholic Church until the election of the new Patriarch Youssef Absi.

In October 2019, Jeanbart said that the Turkish offensive into north-eastern Syria is "another source of violence we would rather have done without." Jeanbart said this is concerning because it will in fact lead to the creation of an extra-territorial pocket within another nation.

He retired as Archbishop of Aleppo on 23 June 2021.

Jeanbart died in Paris, France on 9 May 2026, at the age of 83. According to an obituary published by Catholic charity Aid to the Church in Need, with which he worked closely as a project partner, "Archbishop Jeanbart never ceased speaking publicly about the suffering of Syria’s Christians. During the Syrian civil war, Archbishop Jeanbart became one of the strongest advocates for the survival of Christianity in Syria, repeatedly warning against the disappearance of ancient Christian communities from the Middle East."

== Relations with Islam in the Middle East ==
At the Special Assembly of the Synod of Bishops (Catholic) for the Middle East, Jeanbart said, "I suggest (given the emigration of Christians) to spread optimism among our faithful about their future in the country. Our countries are yet not without resources and values! Let us learn to be friends of our Muslim brothers; helping them to open to us!"

Catholic Church titles
| Preceded by Néophytos Edelby | Archeparch of Aleppo; 1995–2021 | Succeeded by Georges Masri |
