= Matilde Salem =

Servant of God Matilde Salem
- Born: November 15, 1904; Aleppo, Syria
- Died: February 27, 1961 (aged 56); Salesian Church, Aleppo, Syria

Matilde Salem, ASC (November 15, 1904 – February 27, 1961, Aleppo, Syria) was a Syrian Salesian cooperator, community leader, and Catholic Laywoman. She was proclaimed a Servant of God by the Archbishop of the Melkite Greek Catholic Archeparchy of Aleppo, Isidore Fattal.

== Life and Marriage ==
Matilde Salem, née Chelhot, was born in Aleppo, Syria on November 15, 1904 to a wealthy family. She studied in a convent belonging to the Armenian Sisters of the Immaculate Conception, from which she developed intense internal prayer life. At the age of 18, she was wed to one Georges Elias Salem, a successful young businessman, on August 15, 1922. Georges was a very austere, strict, possessive, and authoritarian man, in which Matilde would have to try very hard to calm down at times. He was nonetheless kind to Matilde. They soon discovered that they would not have children of their own. Later on, Georges became ill with type 2 diabetes, which he would soon succumb to on October 26, 1944. They were married for 22 years.

== School and the Georges Salem Foundation ==
Before Georges' death, Matilde and her husband, advised by Bishop Isidoro Fattal, The Greco-Catholic Metropolitan of Aleppo, had thought of opening a technical school that would educate future Christian workers. It was after her husband's death that Matilde discovered that her true vocation was to "give herself to her neighbor with the greatest love."

In accordance with Georges' will, she spearheaded the project and founding of the 'George Salem Foundation', in which she became its first acting president. Matilde planned to set up the technical school as per advice Archbishop Fattal, which was to be run in part by the Marist Brothers. But, less than a year in, they left Aleppo, subsequently abandoning the school, partly due to the conclusion of the promulgation of the 'French Mandate' which joined the states of Aleppo and Damascus to create the State of Syria. She once again turned to the Archbishop, in which he suggested they leave for Turin and request the then Rector Major of the Salesians, Pedro Ricaldone, to supply the school with teachers and spiritual guidance.

The school finally opened its doors in 1948, amidst the then ravenous Israeli-Palestinian war. Soon, both the school and institute were met by refugees from the neighboring countries. Known as the 'Mother Margaret of Aleppo', in reference to the Venerable Mother Margaret Occhiena, she met them with kindness- sheltering, comforting, consoling, and feeding them.

== Death ==
On Pentecost Monday, May 26, 1958, she suffered from a hemorrhage while working in her garden. Her gynecologist said that it was due to a tumor. She was to be operated in Paris, but the disease grew so ravenous that the surgery had to take place in the US to undergo cobalt radiation to treat the malignant proliferation of which was then diagnosed as cancer. In response to this diagnosis, she simply replied: "Thank you, my God."

The treatment was initially considered a success, which allowed her to return to her home that very same year. In March 1960 however, while slowly returning to her regular life of active service, the cancerous malignancy returned. She then traveled to the famous Grotto of Our Lady of Lourdes in Lourdes, France. She returned to Aleppo and died on February 7, 1961, aged 56. She was buried alongside her husband, Georges, and was interred into the Salesian Church there. Archbishop Fattal presided over the requiem, in which he referred to her as 'Santa Matilde'.

== Beatification ==
The diocesan process for her possible beatification started on October 20, 1995. Fr. Abbud Gharghour was assigned as the postulator for the beatification process.
