= Patriarch Ignatius =

Patriarch Ignatius may refer to:

- Ignatius of Antioch, Bishop of Antioch in 68–107
- Ignatios of Constantinople, Patriarch of Constantinople in 847–858 and 867–877
- Ignatius II, Syriac Orthodox Patriarch of Antioch in 878–883
- Ignatius III David, Syriac Orthodox Patriarch of Antioch in 1222–1252
- Ignatius of Bulgaria, Patriarch of Bulgaria c. 1272–1278
- Ignatius of Moscow, Patriarch of Moscow and all Russia in 1605–1606
- Ignatius III Atiyah, Greek Orthodox Patriarch of Antioch in 1619–1634
- Ignatius IV Sarrouf, Melkite Greek Catholic Patriarch of Antioch in 1812
- Ignatius V Qattan, Melkite Greek Catholic Patriarch of Antioch in 1816–1833
- Ignatius I Daoud, Syriac Catholic Patriarch of Antioch in 1998–2001
- Ignatius IV of Antioch, Greek Orthodox Patriarch of Antioch in 1979–2012
- Ignatius Zakka I Iwas, Syriac Orthodox Patriarch of Antioch in 1980–2014
- "Ignatius" has been the first name of all the Syriac Orthodox Patriarchs of Antioch since the 15th century AD
