= Melkite Greek Catholic Archeparchy of Aleppo =

Eastern Catholic archeparchy in Syria

Coordinates: 36.1994°N 37.1619°E

Archeparchy of Aleppo (Melkite Greek) Archidioecesis Aleppensis o Beroeensis Graecorum Melkitarum
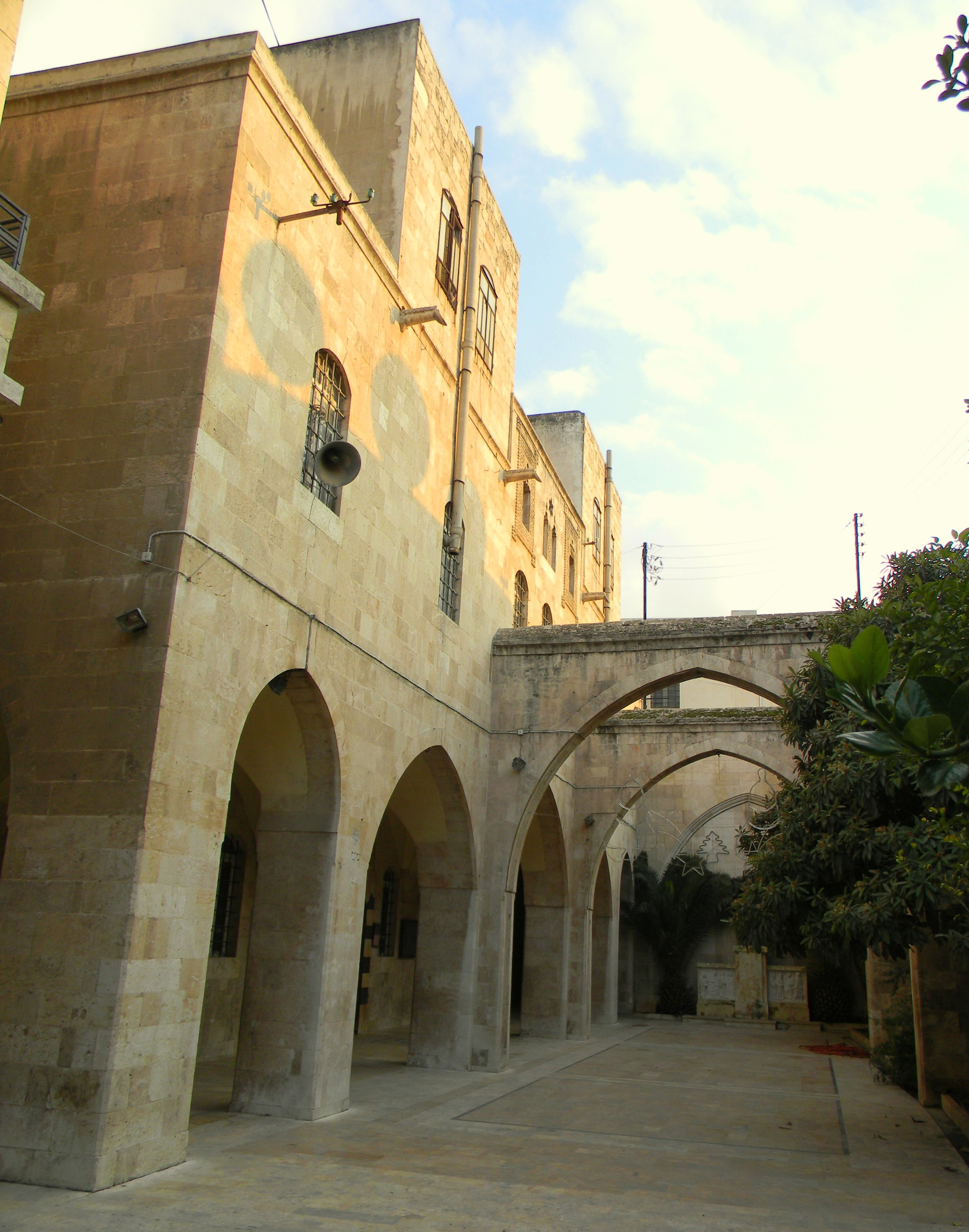
- Cathedral of the Virgin Mary, Aleppo

Location
- Country: Syria

Statistics
- Population: (as of 2012); 18,000
- Parishes: 12

Information
- Denomination: Melkite Greek Catholic Church
- Rite: Byzantine Rite
- Established: 1724
- Cathedral: Cathedral the Virgin Mary, Aleppo

Current leadership
- Pope: Leo XIV
- Patriarch: Youssef Absi
- Archeparch: Georges Masri

Melkite Greek Catholic Archeparchy of Aleppo (Latin: Archidioecesis Aleppensis o Beroeensis Graecorum Melkitarum) is an archeparchy of the Melkite Greek Catholic Church located in Syria, based in Aleppo. Its current archeparch is Georges Masri.

== Territory and statistics ==
The archeparchy extends its jurisdiction over the Syrian governorates of Aleppo, Idlib, Raqqa, Deir ez-Zor and Hassaké (or Djéziré). Its archeparchial seat is the city of Aleppo, where the Cathedral of the Virgin Mary is located.

The territory is divided into 12 parishes and has 18,000 baptized.

== History ==
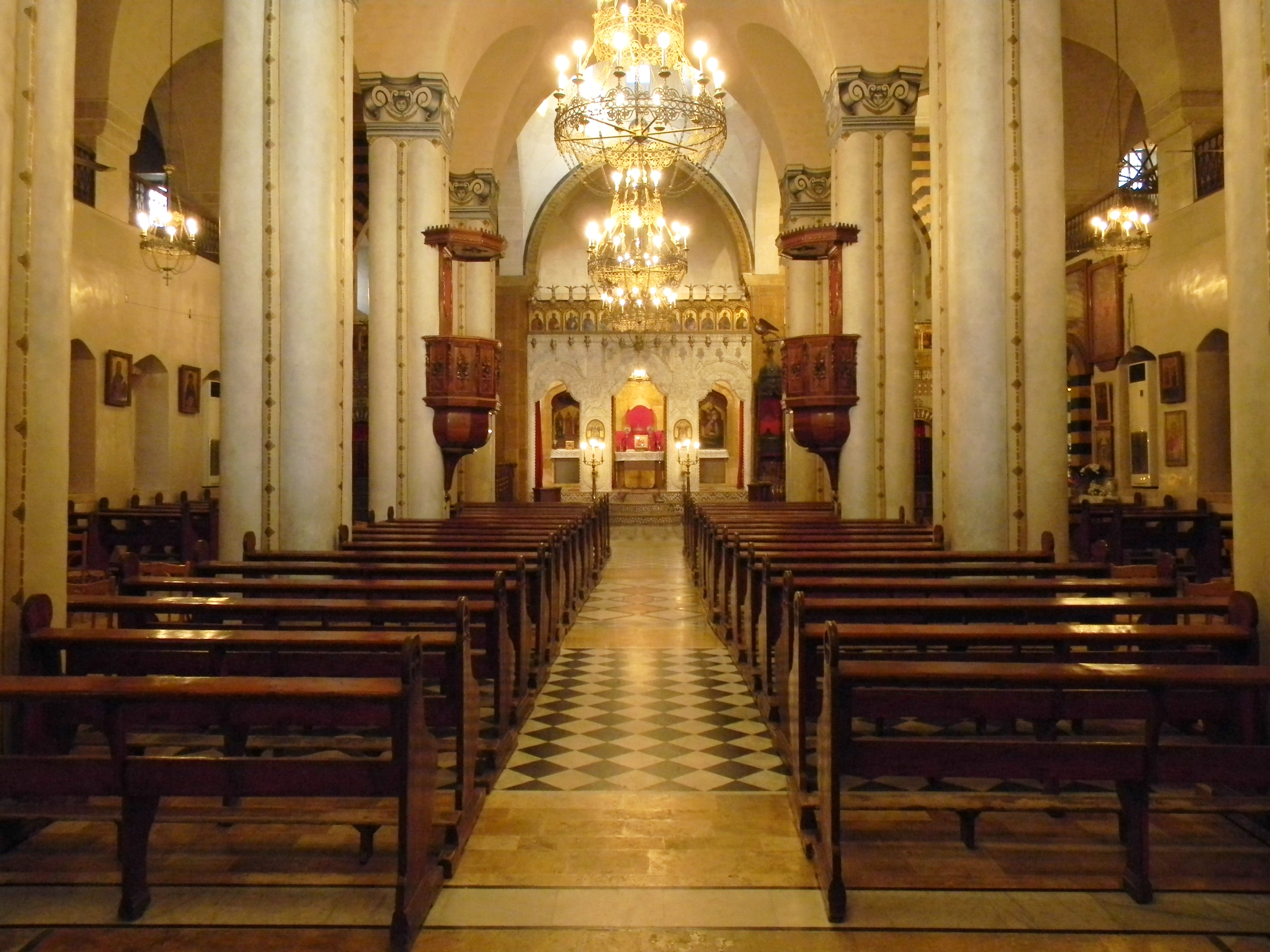
Cathedral interior

The Archeparchy of Aleppo is one of the oldest ones of the Melkite Patriarchate of Antioch. The eparchy of Berea (ancient name of Aleppo) had its origin goes back to the First Council of Nicaea (325), during which Bishop Eustathius of Aleppo was chosen for the first time by Melkite Patriarch of Antioch. The most famous bishop of Aleppo was Acacius (379-433), who played an important role in the life of the Eastern Churches. After the Council of Chalcedon (451), the Melkite clergy found their headquarters in Aleppo. The eparchy of Aleppo was elevated to the rank of archeparchy in the sixth century.

The Cathedral of Aleppo was rebuilt after the Arab conquest in 637 as a mosque. During the Crusade to 1147, the mosque was converted to a cathedral and became the seat of the church hierarchy again.

The reoccupation of Aleppo by Mongols and Tatars in 1400 led to the persecution of the Christian community of Aleppo. It was only in the 16th century that Christian life and ecclesiastical institutions returned. Aleppo grew up into a thriving metropolis and with the union of the Melkite Greek Catholic Church and the Roman Catholic Church, a new religious center was established in Syria.

The Melkite community of Aleppo is one of the oldest in the region. The eparchy of Berea (ancient name of Aleppo) dates back to the fourth century and was elevated to the rank of archeparchy in the sixth century.

The Greek Catholic Archeparchy was officially born by the division which occurred in 1724 between the community that formally declared a union with Rome and the community that remained under the influence of Constantinople. Previously the Greek Orthodox community of Aleppo had shown sympathy for Catholicism, and some bishops personally had made profession of the Catholic faith, among them Gregory in 1698, Gennadio in about 1700, and Gerasimos in 1721. Gerasimos is the bishop after whom the current series of Aleppinian Catholic Archeparchs was named. His tenure lasted from 1721 to 1732. The Greek Catholic Archeparchy finally emerged in 1724.

The persecution to which the Catholic community was subjected forced the archeparch and most of the faithful to seek refuge in Lebanon. Only in 1830 with the official recognition by the Ottoman authorities, the Melkite Greek Catholics were able to return to Aleppo: Archeparch Gregorios Chahiat was the first to reside permanently in Aleppo, after almost a century of exile. In 1830, the Melkite bishop's seat returned to the rebuilt Cathedral in Aleppo.

The archeparch carries the titles of Aleppo, Seleucia and Cirrus. The title of Seleucia was added in 1844 to justify the rank of archeparch. Cirrus was added in 1869 following the extension of its jurisdiction over Killis, near which is the ancient Cirrus, where a group of Greek Orthodox churches could join the Catholic Church.

Four Archeparchs of Aleppo were elevated to the Melkite Patriarchate of Antioch: Maximos II Hakim in 1760, Maximos III Mazloum in 1833, Cyril VIII Jaha in 1902 and Demetrius I Qadi in 1919.

== Archeparchs of Aleppo ==
- Gerasimos Saigh, BC (26 December 1721 - 1731)
- Maximos II Hakim, BC (23 May 1733 - 1 August 1760, then Patriarch of Antioch)
- Ignatius Jerbou (September 1761 - 1 December 1776)
- Germanos Adam (July 1777 - 10 November 1809 deceased)
- Maximos III Mazloum (26 July 1810 - 3 June 1816 revoked election)
- Basil Haractingi, BC (3 June 1816 - 29 May 1823)
- Sede vacante (1823 - 1832)
- Pierre (Gregorios) Chahiat (1832 - 24 August 1843 deceased)
- Demetrius Antachi (29 September 1844 - 9 July 1863 deceased)
- Paolo Hatem (27 September 1863 - 10 February 1885 deceased)
- Cyril VIII Geha (3 May 1885 - 29 June 1902, then Patriarch of Antioch)
- Demetrius I Qadi (27 October 1903 - 6 April 1919, then Patriarch of Antioch)
- Pierre-Macario Saba (25 June 1919 - 28 July 1943)
- Isidore Fattal (13 August 1943 - 4 September 1961)
- Athanasios Toutoungi (5 December 1961 - 6 March 1968)
- Néophytos Edelby, BA (6 March 1968 - 10 June 1995)
- Jean-Clément Jeanbart (2 August 1995 - 17 September 2021)
- Georges Masri (since 17 September 2021)

== See also ==
- Media related to Melkite Greek Catholic Archeparchy of Aleppo at Wikimedia Commons

== Sources ==
- Official Site (in Arabic)
- http://www.catholic-hierarchy.org/diocese/dalpm.html
- https://web.archive.org/web/20120419194326/http://www.pgc-lb.org/english/Church3.shtml#Aleppo
- https://web.archive.org/web/20131609132700/http://www.hmml.org/preservation10/GCAA.htm
- http://www.pgc-lb.org/fre/melkite_greek_catholic_church/Metropole-of-Aleppo
