= Athanasius V Matar =

Head of the Melkite Greek Catholic Church in 1813

- Patriarch of Antioch
- Church: Melkite Greek Catholic Church
- See: Patriarch of Antioch
- Installed: 14 August 1813
- Term ended: 20 November 1813
- Predecessor: Ignatius IV Sarrouf
- Successor: Macarius IV Tawil

Orders
- Consecration: 1798 (Bishop) by Agapius II Matar

Personal details
- Born: Gabriel Matar
- Died: 20 November 1813

Athanasius V Gabriel Matar was Patriarch of the Melkite Greek Catholic Church for a few months in 1813.

== Life ==
Gabriel Matar was born in Damascus. He was the brother of patriarch Agapius II Matar and, as his brother, he too entered in the religious order of the Basilian Salvatorians. Gabriel Matar studied in Rome for a short period and was ordained priest in 1782. In 1798 he was consecrated bishop of Hauran by his brother patriarch Agapius II Matar, and in 1800 he was transferred to the diocese of Saida.

On 14 August 1813 Gabriel Matar was elected patriarch, under the name Athanasius, by a synod of bishops held at Ain Traz Seminary. His election had no time to be confirmed by the Roman Congregation of Propaganda Fide because he died on 20 November 1813.

== Notes ==
Catholic Church titles
Preceded by Ignatius IV	Patriarch of Antioch; 1813	Succeeded by Macarius IV
