= Etienne Soukkarie =

- Patriarchal Vicar of Egypt and Sudan
- Native name: إتيان سوكاري
- Church: Melkite Greek Catholic Church
- Archdiocese: Melkite Patriarchal Vicariate of Egypt and Sudan
- In office: 25 April 1920 – 25 November 1921
- Predecessor: Pierre-Macario Saba
- Successor: Anthony Farage
- Other post: Titular Archbishop of Myra dei Greco-Melkiti (1920-1921)

Orders
- Ordination: 1891
- Consecration: 25 April 1920 by Demetrius I Qadi

Personal details
- Born: 17 October 1868 Damascus, Syria Vilayet, Ottoman Empire
- Died: 25 November 1921 (aged 53)

Etienne Soukkarie, even Stephen Sukkariyeh or Etienne Soukharyé (born on 17 October 1868 in Damascus, Syria - died on 25 November 1921) was Patriarchal Vicar of the Patriarchal Vicariate of Egypt and Sudan.

== Life ==
Etienne Soukkarie in 1891 was ordained to the priesthood. On April 25, 1920, he was simultaneously appointed Titular Archbishop of Myra of Greek Melkites and Patriarchal Vicar of Alexandria. Soukkarie was the successor to the Auxiliary Bishop Pierre-Macario Saba (1903-1919). The Patriarch of Antioch Archbishop Demetrios I Qadi consecrated him bishop on the same day. His co-consecrators were Archbishop Nicolas Cadi of Bosra and Hauran and Archbishop Maximos IV Sayegh of Tyre. He was succeeded by Antonio Farage.
