= Ignatius IV =

Ignatius IV may refer to:

- Ignatius IV Sarrouf (1742–1812)
- Ignatius IV of Antioch (1920–2012)
