= Pierre-Macario Saba =

Syrian priest (1873–1943)

- Archeparch of Aleppo
- Native name: بيير ماكاريو سابا
- Church: Melkite Greek Catholic Church
- Archdiocese: Melkite Greek Catholic Archeparchy of Aleppo
- In office: 25 June 1919 – 28 July 1943
- Predecessor: Joseph Qadi
- Successor: Isidore Fattal
- Previous posts: Titular Bishop of Palmyra dei Greco-Melkiti (1903-1919); Patriarchal Vicar of Egypt and Sudan (1903-1919)

Orders
- Ordination: 2 March 1897
- Consecration: 29 November 1903 by Cyril VIII Geha

Personal details
- Born: 14 February 1873 Aleppo, Aleppo vilayet, Ottoman Empire
- Died: 28 July 1943 (aged 70) Aleppo, Mandatory Syrian Republic

Pierre-Macario Saba (14 February 1873 – 28 July 1943) was Archbishop of the Melkite Greek Catholic Archeparchy of Aleppo in Syria.

== Life ==
Saba was ordained as a priest on 3 March 1898. On 29 November 1903 he received a simultaneous appointment as auxiliary bishop in Alexandria, Egypt and Titular Bishop of Palmyra, Syria. Patriarch Cyril VIII Geha of Antioch consecrated him on the same day to the bishop. His co-consecrators were Archbishop Gaudenzio Bonfigli, OFM (Titular Bishop of Cabasa and Apostolic Delegate of Egypt) and Bishop Joseph Dumani, BS from Tripoli, Lebanon.

On 25 June 1919 Saba was appointed Archbishop of Aleppo, which he remained until his death.
