= Demetrius I =

Demetrius I or Demetrios I may refer to:

- Demetrius I of Macedon (337–283 BC), king of Macedon
- Demetrius I of Bactria, Greco-Bactrian king (reigned c. 200–180 BC)
- Demetrius I Soter (born 185 BC, reign 161–150 BC), ruler of the Hellenistic Seleucid Empire
- Pope Demetrius I of Alexandria, ruled in 189–232
- Demetrius Zvonimir of Croatia (died 1089), King of Croatia
- Demetrius I of Georgia (c. 1093–1156), Georgian king
- Demetrios I Kantakouzenos, Despot of the Morea in 1383
- Demetrius I Starshy (died 1399), Duke of Bryansk
- Demetrius I Qadi (1861–1925), Patriarch of the Melkite Greek Catholic Church
- Demetrios I of Constantinople (1914–1991), Ecumenical Patriarch of Constantinople in 1972–1991

== See also ==
- Patriarch Dimitrije, Serbian Patriarch in 1920–1930
