= Maximos V Hakim =

Head of the Melkite Greek Catholic Church from 1967 to 2000

Maximos V
- Patriarch of Antioch
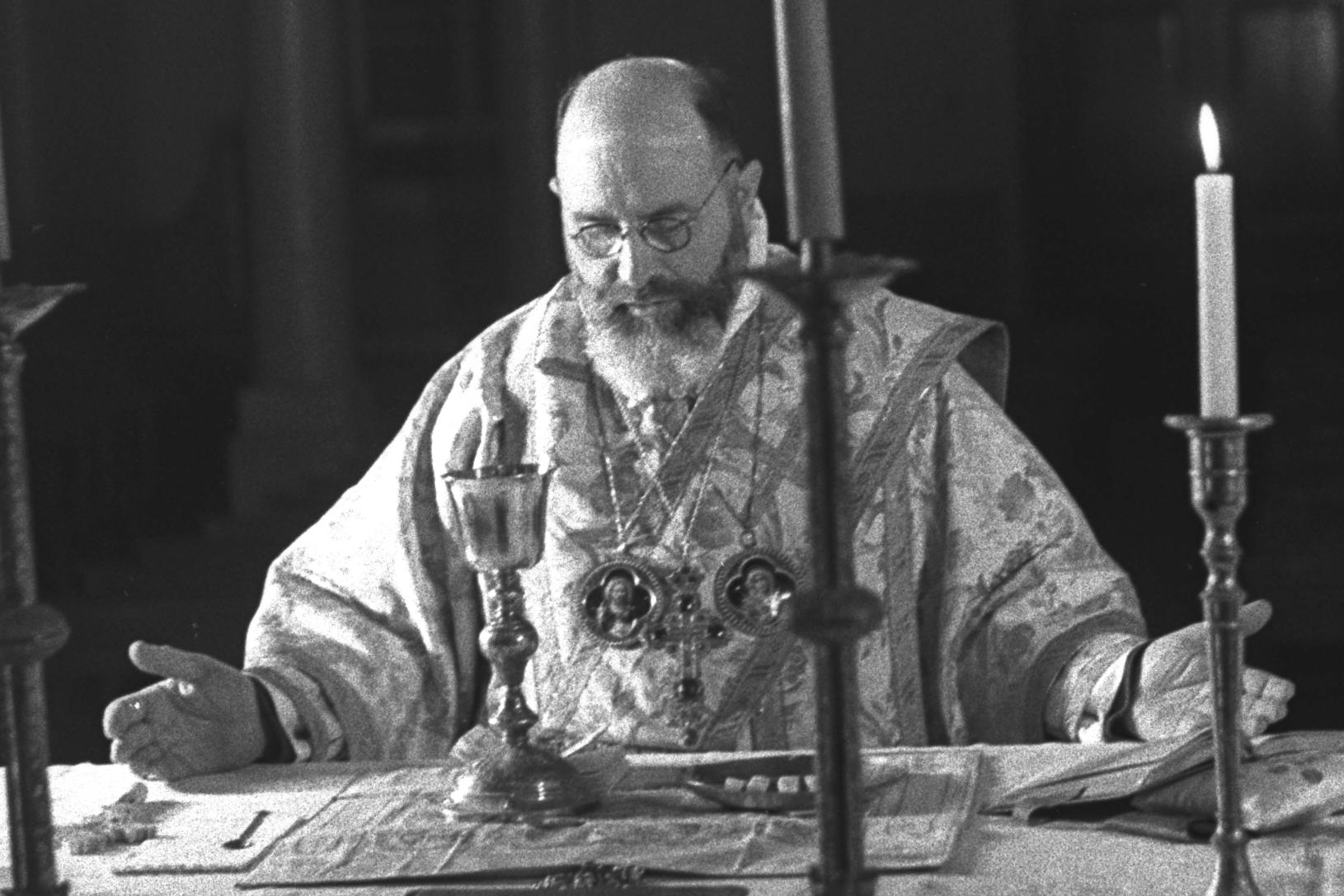
- Hakim on Christmas, 1957
- Native name: ماكسيموس الخامس حكيم
- Church: Catholic Church (Melkite)
- See: Antioch
- Elected: 22 November 1967
- Installed: 26 November 1967
- Term ended: 22 November 2000
- Predecessor: Maximos IV Sayegh
- Successor: Gregory III Laham
- Other post: Bishop of Damas
- Previous posts: Bishop of Akka (1943–1964); Archbishop of Akka (1964–1967)

Orders
- Ordination: 20 July 1930 by Maximos IV Sayegh
- Consecration: 13 June 1943 by Cyril IX Moghabghab

Personal details
- Born: George Selim Hakim; 18 May 1908 Tanta, Khedivate of Egypt
- Died: 29 June 2001 (aged 93) Beirut, Lebanon
- Residence: Syria and Lebanon
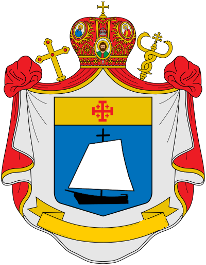
- Coat of arms

Maximos V Hakim (Arabic: ماكسيموس الخامس حكيم; born George Selim Hakim; May 18, 1908 – June 29, 2001) was a Melkite Greek Catholic hierarch, who served as the Melkite Catholic Patriarch of Antioch from 1967 to 2000. He guided the Church through turbulent changes in the Middle East and rapid expansion in the Western hemisphere.

== Life ==
He was born George Selim Hakim at Tanta, Egypt, on May 18, 1908, to parents who were originally from Aleppo. He was educated locally and at Le Collège de la Sainte Famille (High School of the Holy Family) Jesuit school in Cairo. After completing his studies at St. Anne of Jerusalem, he was ordained a priest in the Basilica of St. Anne by Maximos IV Sayegh, then Archbishop of Tyre, on July 20, 1930. As a young priest he taught for a year in the patriarchal school in Beirut before returning to Cairo in 1931.

== Episcopate ==
He was appointed eparch on March 13, 1943, and consecrated Eparch of St. John of Acre, Haifa, Nazareth and all Galilee, in Cairo on June 13, 1943, by Patriarch Cyril IX Moghabghab, assisted by the Archbishops Dionysius Kfoury, Titular bishop of Tarsus dei Greco-Melkiti, and Pierre Medawar, Titular bishop of Pelusium dei Greco-Melkiti, patriarchal auxiliaries. On November 18, 1964, Hakim became Archeparch. He was elected Patriarch by the Holy Synod at Ain Traz on November 22, 1967, and his election was confirmed on November 26 of the same year.

As a priest, he distinguished himself by his running of the Patriarchal College in Cairo and by the launching and publication of the review Le Lien. Later, as an archbishop, he built schools, a junior seminary, an orphanage, a home for the elderly and several churches. He took particular care for the clergy and for the religious and secular orders and he brought in several groups of Europeans come to integrate themselves into the Church. As archbishop he spearheaded efforts to provide relief for Palestinians during the 1948 exodus.

Under his guidance as patriarch, a minor seminary was established at Damascus and later a major seminary for the formation of priests was opened at Raboueh in Lebanon. He later funded numerous scholarships for needy seminarians during the Lebanese Civil War. He also oversaw the growth of the Melkite church in North and South America as many of the faithful emigrated to the West.

Maximos condemned the violence that pitted Muslim against Christian in Lebanon, where Greek Catholics constitute 4% of the population. In 1982, he negotiated with Druze leader Walid Jumblatt to safeguard ancient Christian villages in the Chouf valley. He enjoyed warmer ties with the Syrian government than the Nasrallah Boutros Sfeir, patriarch of the more powerful Maronite Catholic community. Even so, community politics would prove dangerous for him at times. In 1990, he was targeted by would-be assassins as he travelled to the predominantly Christian city of Zahle, located in the predominantly Shi'ite Beq'a valley.

Following an old tradition of the more-than-900-year-old Order of Knighthood, founded in Jerusalem to take care of lepers in the Hospital St. Lazare, he was the Spiritual Protector of the international ecumenical Military and Hospitaller Order of St. Lazarus of Jerusalem, as is his successor.

Patriarch Maximos resigned on November 22, 2000, due to failing health, and was succeeded by Patriarch Gregory III Laham. He died on June 29, 2001, in Beirut.

== Controversy ==
In the aftermath of the 1948 Arab–Israeli War, Hakim negotiated with Yehoshua ("Josh") Palmon, then leader of the Arab Section in the Israeli Foreign Ministry, for the return of Galilee Christian Arabs (then refugees in Lebanon), in exchange for Hakim's future goodwill toward Israel. In the end, several thousand Galilee Christians (including several hundred from Eilabun) were allowed to return in the summer of 1949.

In the 1950s, while he was Archbishop of Akka, the future patriarch was involved in the fate of the Palestinians of the two depopulated Christian villages of Kafr Bir'im and Iqrit. He alerted the Vatican and other Christian authorities about the expulsion of the villagers, and lobbied for their return. He said "the Arab League had issued orders exhorting the people to seek a temporary refuge in neighboring countries." The Israeli diplomat Abba Eban told the U.N. Special Political Committee in 1957 that Hakim said:

The refugees had been confident that their absence from Palestine would not last long; that they would return within a few days [or] within a week or two; their leaders had promised them that the Arab armies would crush the 'Zionist gangs' very quickly and that there would be no need for panic or fear of a long exile.

A 1949 pamphlet Arab Refugees: Facts and Figures prepared by the Research Department of the Jewish Agency for Israel, quoted a letter by Karl Baehr, executive secretary of the American Palestine Committee, to the New York Herald Tribune:

The role played by the British authorities in the Arab mass flight is also stressed by Monsignor George Hakim, Archbishop of the Greek Catholic Church (a Uniate Church which is in fellowship with the Vatican and counts 20,864 adherents in Palestine). An Arab himself and a former supporter of the Mufti, Archbishop Hakim told Baeher... that an important element in precipitating the flight, particularly in the Haifa area (where Monsignor lives) was "the fact that the British informed the Arabs that they would not protect them. Since most of the Arab leaders had already fled, the people were thrown into a panic so they fled by sea to Lebanon. They fled in spite of the fact that the Jewish authorities guaranteed their safety and rights as citizens of Israel."

Erskine Childers investigated the claims made about Hakim and the mass emigration of Arab Christians from Israel, and published in The Spectator on May 12, 1961, a letter from Hakim addressing the allegations:

There is nothing in this statement to justify the construction which many propagandists had put on it, namely, that it established the allegation widely disseminated by partisan sources that the Arab leaders had urged the Arab inhabitants of Palestine to flee.

As far as I can recollect, the aforesaid statement was intended to voice the strong feeling of resentment and revulsion felt by the refugees. They were convinced by what they had heard and read that the defeat of the Jewish armed forces, the re-establishment of peace and order throughout the country, and the institution of Arab rule, would be achieved within a short time. Instead of such achievements the Arab States had twice agreed to a truce, and the Arab armies were inactive. Hence the strong feeling of disappointment and frustration among the file and rank of refugees.

At no time did I state that the flight of the refugees was due to the orders, explicit or implicit, of their leaders, military or political, to leave the country and seek shelter in the adjacent Arab territories. On the contrary, no such orders were ever made by the military commanders, or by the Higher Arab Committee, or indeed, by the Arab League or Arab States. I have not the least doubt that any such allegations are sheer concoctions and falsifications... as soon as hostilities began between Israel and the Arab States, it became the settled policy of the Government to drive away the Arabs.

The causes of the 1948 Palestinian expulsion and flight are still a subject of contentious debate among historians. However, findings since the 1980s by the 'New Historians', most prominently Benny Morris, cast doubt on the predominance of foreign, Arab-instigated mass evacuation as portrayed in the official Israeli account.

== Works ==
A prolific writer, Maximos is best remembered for his Arabic work Al Rabita and French works Message de Galiléerenc and Pages d'Évangile lues en Galilée.

== Distinctions ==
- Founder and first Grand Master of the Patriarchal Order of the Holy Cross of Jerusalem

== See also ==
- Melkite Greek Catholic Patriarchate of Antioch and All the East
- Melkite Greek Catholic Church
- Maximos IV Sayegh, late patriarch
- Joseph Raya, late archbishop
- Elias Chacour, current archbishop of Galilee
- Gregory III Laham, current patriarch
- Kafr Bir'im
- Iqrit
- Blaming the Victims: Spurious Scholarship and the Palestinian Question, "Broadcasts", by Christopher Hitchens
