= Nikolaki Sawaf =

- Archeparch Emeritus of Latakia
- Church: Catholic Church
- Archdiocese: Archeparchy of Latakia
- In office: 14 January 2000 – 17 August 2021
- Predecessor: Fares Maakaroun
- Successor: Georges Khawam

Orders
- Ordination: 15 April 1968 by Néophytos Edelby
- Consecration: 4 March 2000 by Boulos Nassif Borkhoche

Personal details
- Born: 8 February 1943 (age 83) Aleppo, mandatory Syrian Republic, French Empire

Nikolaki Sawaf (born 8 February 1943 in Aleppo) is the former archbishop of the Melkite Greek Catholic Archeparchy of Latakia from 2000 to 2021.

== Life ==
Nikolaki Sawaf was on 15 April 1968 ordained priest. On 14 January 2000, Sawaf was appointed and succeeded Fares Maakaroun as Archbishop of Latakia. Archbishop Boulos Nassif Borkhoche of Bosra and Hauran consecrated him as bishop and his co-consecrators were Archbishop Jean-Clément Jeanbart of Aleppo and Archbishop Fares Maakaroun of Nossa Senhora do Paraíso em São Paulo in Brazil on 4 March 2000.
