= Patriarch Ignatius IV =

Patriarch Ignatius IV may refer to:

- Ignatius IV Sarrouf, Melkite Greek Catholic Patriarch of Antioch in 1812
- Ignatius IV of Antioch, Eastern Orthodox Patriarch of Antioch in 1979–2012
