= Isidore Fattal =

Melkite Greek Catholic bishop

- Archeparch of Aleppo
- Native name: إيزيدور فتال
- Church: Melkite Greek Catholic Church
- Archdiocese: Melkite Greek Catholic Archeparchy of Aleppo
- In office: 16 July 1943 – 4 September 1961
- Predecessor: Pierre-Macario Saba
- Successor: Athanasios Toutoungi
- Previous post: Eparch of Baniyas (1943)

Orders
- Ordination: 20 July 1912
- Consecration: 1 August 1943 by Cyril IX Moghabghab

Personal details
- Born: 26 October 1886 Aleppo, Aleppo vilayet, Ottoman Empire
- Died: 4 September 1961 (aged 74)

Isidore Fattal (26 October 1886 – 4 September 1961) was a bishop of the Melkite Greek Catholic Church in Lebanon and Syria.

== Life ==
On 20 July 1912, Isidore Fattal received the ordination to the priesthood and on 20 July 1943, he was appointed Bishop of the Melkite Greek Catholic Archeparchy of Baniyas in Lebanon. The consecration took place on 1 August 1943. In the same year and month he was appointed Archbishop of the Melkite Greek Catholic Archeparchy of Aleppo in Syria. His successor in Banyas was Archbishop Antonio Basilio Leone Kilzi, BA. From 13 August 1943 until his death on 4 September 1961, Fattal held that post and died at the age of 75 years. His successor in Aleppo was Archbishop Athanasios Toutoungi.

== The "Great bishop of Syria" ==
In a biography (1963) Archimandrite Ignace Dick referred to the Archbishop Fattal as the "Great bishop of Syria". He writes:

"Archbishop Isidore Fattal was a key designer of during a critical period to the Christianity in Syria. After the war he founded, under the French rule in Syria, the pastoral and educational work in the diocese. In Syria, he led the Christians to religious personality, he promoted the freedom of conscience and personal training. Since 1943 he had restructured, reorganized and reclassified the Melkite Greek Catholic Church in Syria. Thus, the pastors were given their own areas of responsibility, the parishes were divided equally and the bishop sent regularly to them the Sunday pastoral letters. Together with the Bishop of Beirut, the future patriarch of Antioch Archbishop Maximos IV Sayegh, in 1946 he founded schools for girls and trusted them to the "Sisters of Our Lady of Perpetual Help" on the line. Among his works are the foundation of a technical training school, a Catholic Workers Association and the expansion of churches.

Later Syrian governments have recognized its benefits for the country and recorded it with several honors. His strength was never interfere into politics but constantly lead the dialogue with the rulers. His motto "The good shepherd lays down his life for his sheep" (Jn 10,11) showed as Isidore Fattal sacrificed his life to serving his community, this also underlined his heraldic animal Pelican, which is known as a symbol for Jesus Christ and his Parental love. (Excerpts)".
