= Macarius IV Tawil =

Head of the Melkite Greek Catholic Church from 1813 to 1815

- Patriarch of Antioch
- Church: Melkite Greek Catholic Church
- See: Patriarch of Antioch
- Installed: 10 December 1813
- Term ended: 15 December 1815
- Predecessor: Athanasius V Matar
- Successor: Ignatius V Qattan

Orders
- Consecration: 1811 (Bishop) by Agapius II Matar

Personal details
- Died: 15 December 1815

Macarius IV Tawil (or Taouil) was Patriarch of the Melkite Greek Catholic Church from 1813 to 1815.

== Life ==
Macarius Tawil was born in Damascus. He entered in the religious order of the Basilian Salvatorians of which he was Superior from 1804 to 1807 and from 1810 to 1812. He was consecrated bishop of Zahle and Forzol by patriarch Agapius II Matar in 1811.

Macarius Tawil was elected patriarch by a synod of bishops held on 10 December 1813 at the Holy Saviour monastery, and he kept the name of Macarius . His election was contested, and it was still under review by the Roman Congregation of Propaganda Fide when Macarius IV Tawil died of pestilence on 15 December 1815.

== Notes ==
Catholic Church titles
| Preceded by Athanasius V | Patriarch of Antioch; 1813-1815 | Succeeded by Ignatius V |
