= Basil Khoury =

- Archeparch of Homs
- Native name: باسيل الخوري
- Church: Melkite Greek Catholic Church
- Archdiocese: Archeparchy of Homs
- In office: 20 November 1920 – 15 October 1938
- Predecessor: Flavien Khoury
- Successor: Athanasios Toutoungi
- Other post: Titular Archeparch of Sergiopolis (1938-1941)

Orders
- Consecration: 12 December 1920 by Demetrius I Qadi

Personal details
- Born: 23 March 1883 Maarat al-Numan, Aleppo Sanjak, Vilayet of Aleppo, Ottoman Empire
- Died: 21 November 1941 (aged 58)

Basil Khoury (23 March 1883 in Maarat al-Numan – 21 November 1941) was Archbishop of the Melkite Greek Catholic Archeparchy of Homs in Syria.

== Life ==
Basil Khoury succeed on 20 November 1920 Flavien Khoury as appointed Archbishop of Homs. The Patriarch of Antioch Demetrius I Qadi ordained him on 12 December 1920 bishop. With simultaneous appointment as Titular Archbishop of Sergiopolis he became on 25 October 1938 emeritus archbishop and was, until his death on 21 November 1941 Archbishop Emeritus of Homs. His successor was Athanasios Toutoungi.
