= Gregory Atta =

Syrian archbishop (1815–1899)

- Archeparch of Homs
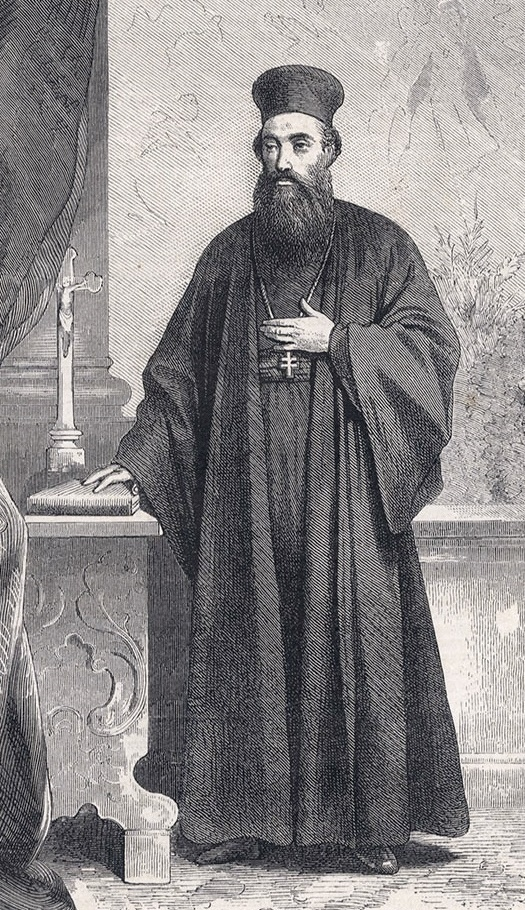
- Native name: غريغوري عطا
- Church: Melkite Greek Catholic Church
- Archdiocese: Archeparchy of Homs
- In office: 20 February 1848 – 3 December 1899
- Predecessor: Archeparchy erected
- Successor: Flavien Khoury

Orders
- Ordination: 1837
- Consecration: 20 February 1849 by Maximos III Mazloum

Personal details
- Born: 14 April 1815 Zahlé, Emirate of Mount Lebanon, Ottoman Empire
- Died: 3 December 1899 (aged 84) Damascus, Damascus Sanjak, Vilayet of Syria, Ottoman Empire

Gregory Atta, born Michael Atta (14 April 1815 – 3 December 1899), was an archbishop of the Melkite Greek Catholic Archeparchy of Homs, church historian and collector of antique manuscripts. He visited Europe in 1860–61 and campaigned among others for alms for the Oriental Christians in Bavaria (in the Roman Catholic dioceses of Augsburg, Wurzburg and Speyer). Later served as a father of the First Vatican Council in Rome.

== Life and work ==
Gregory Atta was baptized as Michael, the son of Melkite Catholic parents in Zahle, Lebanon. It is the third largest city of Lebanon, a Christian stronghold and is known in the Middle East as the "City of Wine and Poetry".

Atta sought the spiritual calling when he was ordained and became oikonomus 1848 of the Melkite Patriarchate of Antioch in Damascus. As Patriarch officiated at this time was Maximos III Mazloum (1833–1855), a learned, worldly-wise man who spent nearly 20 years in exile in Europe and the Melkite Church prospered greatly. Michael Atta belonged as an economist of Patriarchate to the Curia and to his personal environment.

== Archbishop ==
Already on 20 February 1849 Atta received from the Patriarch Mazloum his episcopal consecration and became the archbishop of the newly formed Melkite Greek Catholic Archeparchy of Homs, Hama and Yabroud. With the consecration Michael Atta took the name "Gregory". In addition to his pastoral duties Archbishop Atta collected ancient manuscripts and explored the Christian history in the Middle East, particularly of the Melkite Catholics.

== Trip to Europe ==
In 1860 anti-Christian riots raged and killed some 30,000 believers and many churches and monasteries were looted and burned, and his diocese was one of the most strongly affected. Among those killed were three bishops and 30 priests and the beatified Franciscan Engelbert Kolland. Due to the outstanding help of the Arab leader Abdelkader El Djezairi, although the rest could be restored, the formerly thriving Christian communities, however, were completely devastated. Gregory Atta decided together with other Eastern prelates at a time an unusual action. He drove the shores of Europe to collect urgently needed funds for the reconstruction of his diocese. In 1860 remained Atta in Vienna and 1861 he visited in the same intention, the Kingdom of Bavaria. From King Maximilian II of Bavaria the bishoprics were him to the Roman Catholic Diocese of Augsburg, Roman Catholic Diocese of Wurzburg and Roman Catholic Diocese of Speyer.

The Wiener Professor Friedrich Müller reported in 1898 in the "Melanges" for Charlez de Harlez, Liège canon and Orientalist professor at the Catholic University of Leuven, about his earlier meeting with Archbishop Atta:

"When in the year 1859/60 after the massacre in Damascus Metropolitan Gregorius Ata lived in the local Dominican monastery a long time, I became acquainted with him through the mediation of a higher clergy. The Rev. Mr., who knew no language other than Arabic, asked me to help him upon the application of a short Arab-German Vocabulars."

- Professor Friedrich Müller (linguist), "The origin of Indian script", in "Melanges de Charlez de Harlez" Catholic University of Leuven, 1898, pages 217/218.

In the Roman Catholic Diocese of Speyer, Vicar General Johann Martin Foliot on 15 February 1861, issued a circular (serial no. 349) to all parishes. In it, the then sad situation of Christians in the Middle East is portrayed again and goes on to say:

" ... we will notify all pastor and parish administrator of our diocese that the Greek uniierte Archbishop of Homs and Hamah in Syria, Gregory Ata will arrive in the next few days in Speyer and from here a series of Municipalities will be visited in our diocese to collect alms for the persecuted Christians. In our Bavarian fatherland several priests and bishops of Syria have now arrived and received from the King's Majesty the authorization personally to speak in different parts of the country for support. The reverend Archbishop Gregory Atta, preferably within whose jurisdiction the sword and fire of persecution raged, the Roman Catholic dioceses of Augsburg, Wurzburg and Speyer will be been instructed about this facts".

- Generali collection Diocese of Speyer, Circular No. 349, from 15 February 1861.

The clergy of the diocese in the above letter also invited the Oriental prelates "with word and deed at hand" to go. When visiting places Atta in the Bishopric of Speyer 18 cities were listed, namely: Speyer, Schifferstadt, Frankenthal, Forst, Deidesheim, Neustadt, Kaiserslautern, Landstuhl, St. Ingbert, Blieskastel, Zweibrücken, Maikammer, Edesheim, Landau, Herxheim, Rheinzabern, Rülzheim and Germersheim.

The Diocese of Speyer in 1864 reported on the visit of the Syrian priests of the Church:

“In the year 1861 the Christians in Syria, who were hard pressed and robbed by their enemies and had to make use of the charity of their fellow believers to cover their ecclesiastical needs, found no small sympathy. The Most Reverend Archbishop Ata of Damascus, who personally raised a collection for his unfortunate members of the diocese for this purpose, as he did throughout Bavaria and in the diocese of Speyer, was given a warm welcome in the more important places he visited in the diocese and was delighted with generous gifts of love and also received the sum of 1311 guilders from donations sent directly to the episcopal authority.”

- Schematism Diocese of Speyer, 1864, pages 182/183

Gregory Atta was apparently able to return with a very high amount donated in the home and the entire company proved not least the economic efficiency of the former economists of his ecclesiastical province.

In the essay "The legal relationships of the various rites within the Catholic Church" (Archives of Catholic Canon Law, Volume 7, page 339, Mainz 1864), stated Professor Joseph Hergenröther from Würzburg, later Cardinal, that he in the Archbishop Atta's occasion of his stay in Bavaria held a conversation that he described as "some interesting notes" owe.

By Gregory Atta's visit to the Diocese of Augsburg is noted also that he gave to the local Historical Society an old Turkish silver coin.

== Late Years ==
In 1870 Archbishop Gregory Atta participated at First Vatican Council as a Council Father, and in part, said he was among the minority that voted against the dogma of Papal infallibility.

Gregory Atta ruled his archdiocese for 50 years, until his death in 1899, and was succeeded by Archbishop Flavien Khoury. Atta resided in his last years in Yabroud and died in Damascus. In 1886 named the priest Sylwanos Mansour (1854–1929) as his secretary; later he emigrated to Australia, where he earned a nationwide fame of main Melkite's pastor.

== Fame ==
Gregory Atta was considered as having a profound knowledge of the Oriental Church's history and also wrote several works about it. In the "History of the Christian Arabic literature" by Georg Graf, 1953, he states that Archbishop Atta had a number of writings left behind, but of which only parts were published later. He was a "great bibliophile" "and collected many manuscripts, of which the greater number were scattered after his death"; but a part of the Atta's collection is still in Yabroud. These and Atta's writings were described by Archimandrite and church historian Joseph Nasrallah (1911–93) in 1937 as source material for his treatise "Manuscripts of the Yabroud Melkites".

== Literature ==
- Georg Graf: "History of the Christian Arabic literature", issue 146, Biblioteca Apostolica Vaticana, 1953, page 288.
- Friedrich Müller: "The origin of Indian script", in "Melanges de Charlez de Harlez"., Catholic University of Leuven, 1898, Pages 217/218.
- Diözesanschematismus Speyer, 1864, pages 182 and 183.
