= Georges Khawam =

Syrian Melkite Greek Catholic archbishop (born 1959)

His Eminence Georges Salim Khawam, S.M.S.P.
- Archbishop of Latakia
- Church: Melkite Greek Catholic Church
- Archdiocese: Latakia
- See: Latakia, Syria
- Installed: 17 August 2021
- Predecessor: Nikolaki Sawaf

Orders
- Ordination: 5 August 1984 by Néophytos Edelby
- Consecration: 16 October 2021 by Youssef Absi, Georges Nicholas Haddad and Cyril Salim Bustros

Personal details
- Born: Georges Salim Khawam; 7 April 1959 (age 67) Aleppo, Syria
- Education: Damascus University, Pontifical Biblical Institute

Georges Salim Khawam S.M.S.P. (born 7 April 1959) is a Syrian Melkite Catholic hierarch, who has served as the Archbishop of the Archeparchy of Latakia since 2021.

== Biography ==
Georges Khawam was born on 7 April 1959 in Aleppo, Syria. He entered the minor seminary of the Missionaries of Saint Paul (the Paulist Fathers) in Harissa, Lebanon, where he completed his religious formation and pursued philosophical and theological studies at the St. Paul Institute for Philosophy and Theology, earning a licentiate in theology. He also completed a degree in French literature from Damascus University and made further biblical studies at the Pontifical Biblical Institute in Rome. He was ordained a priest for the Paulist Fathers on 5 August 1984 by Archbishop Néophytos Edelby.

Following his ordination, Khawam held several key academic, pastoral, and leadership roles within his religious institute. He served as a teacher, director of studies, vice-rector of the seminary, and director of the St. Paul Institute for Philosophy and Theology in Harissa, additionally managing the Paulist publishing house. Between 2007 and 2011, he undertook pastoral ministry in France, serving as the rector of the Melkite parish of Saint-Julien-le-Pauvre in Paris. Upon returning to Lebanon, he served as the superior of the Paulist community in Jounieh and Harissa, before being elected Superior General of the Missionaries of Saint Paul from 2013 to 2019. At the conclusion of his mandate as Superior General, he was appointed superior of the Convent of Saints Constantine and Helen in Harissa.

Following his election by the Synod of Bishops of the Melkite Greek Catholic Church, Pope Francis granted his assent to Khawam's appointment as the Archbishop of Latakia on 17 August 2021, succeeding Archbishop Nikolaki Sawaf. He was consecrated as a bishop on 16 October 2021 by Melkite Patriarch Youssef Absi, with Georges Nicholas Haddad and Cyril Salim Bustros serving as co-consecrators.
