= Flavien (given name) =

Flavien is a French masculine given name that may refer to the following notable people:

- Flavien Belson (born 1987), French football midfielder
- Flavien-Guillaume Bouthillier (1844–1907), Canadian lawyer and political figure
- Flavien Enzo Boyomo (born 2001), French football player
- Flavien Conne (born 1980), Swiss ice hockey player
- Flavien Dassonville (born 1991), French cyclist
- Flavien Dupont (1847–1898), Canadian notary and political figure
- Flavien Khoury (1859–1920), Archbishop of the Melkite Greek Catholic Archeparchy of Homs in Syria
- Flavien Maurelet (born 1991), French cyclist
- Flavien Michelini (born 1986), French football midfielder
- Flavien Le Postollec (born 1984), Ivorian-Breton football midfielder
- Flavien Prat (born 1992), French jockey
- Flavien Ranaivo (1914–1999), Malagasy poet and journalist
- Flavien Tait (born 1993), French football midfielder
- Pierre-Flavien Turgeon (1787–1867), Canadian Roman Catholic priest and Archbishop
