= Flavien =

Flavien may refer to

- Flavien (given name)
- Pont Flavien, a Roman bridge across the River Touloubre in southern France
- Saint-Flavien, Quebec, a municipality in Canada
