= Diocese of Laodicea =

Diocese, archdiocese or eparchy of Laodicea may refer to:

- Archdiocese of Laodicea in Syria, modern Latakia
- Diocese of Laodicea in Phrygia
- Diocese of Laodicea Combusta
- Diocese of Laodicea ad Libanum
- Maronite Catholic Eparchy of Latakia, ancient Laodicea in Syria
- Melkite Greek Catholic Archeparchy of Latakia, ancient Laodicea in Syria
