= Anthony Farage =

Catholic bishop (1885–1963)

- Patriarchal Vicar of Egypt and Sudan
- Native name: أنتوني فراج
- Church: Catholic Church
- Archdiocese: Melkite Patriarchal Vicariate of Egypt and Sudan
- In office: 11 December 1922 – 1928
- Predecessor: Etienne Soukkarie
- Successor: Dionysius Kfoury
- Other post: Titular Bishop of Damiata dei Greco-Melkiti (1961-1963)
- Previous post: Titular Archbishop of Laodicea in Syria per i Melchiti (1922-1961)

Orders
- Ordination: 20 July 1908
- Consecration: 1 January 1922 by Demetrius I Qadi

Personal details
- Born: 28 December 1885 Damascus, Syria vilayet, Ottoman Empire
- Died: 9 November 1963 (aged 77)

Anthony Farage (28 December 1885 in Damascus – 9 November 1963), also Anthony Faraj, was titular archbishop and Patriarchal vicar of the Patriarchal vicariate of Egypt and Sudan.

== Life ==
Anthony Farage was ordained to the priesthood on 20 July 1908. On 1 January 1922, he was appointed and consecrated bishop on the same day. His consecrator was the Patriarch of Antioch, Archbishop Demetrius I Qadi. On 11 December 1922, Farage was named titular bishop of Laodicea in Syria of the Greek Melkites and confirmed as Patriarchal Vicar of Alexandria. From 1 January 1922 until his death on 9 November 1963, he was procurator in Antioch. In addition to the office, he was the 1922-1928 Patriarchal Vicar of Alexandria and was the successor of Etienne Soukkarie. His successor to the patriarchal vicar was Dionysius Kfoury. On 7 March 1961, he was appointed Titular Archbishop of Damietta dei Greco-Melkiti.
