= Athanasios Toutoungi =

Athanasios Toutoungi BA
- Archeparch of Aleppo
- Church: Melkite Greek Catholic Church
- Archdiocese: Melkite Greek Catholic Archeparchy of Aleppo
- In office: 5 December 1961 – 6 March 1968
- Predecessor: Isidore Fattal
- Successor: Néophytos Edelby
- Other post: Titular Archbishop of Tarsus dei Greco-Melkiti (1968-1981)
- Previous post: Archeparch of Homs (1938-1961)

Orders
- Ordination: 20 July 1927
- Consecration: 27 November 1938 by Cyril IX Moghabghab

Personal details
- Born: 6 September 1899 Alexandretta, Aleppo vilayet, Ottoman Empire
- Died: 20 February 1981 (aged 81)

Athanasios Toutoungi (6 September 1899 in Alexandretta, now İskenderun, Turkey – 20 February 1981) was an archbishop of the Melkite Greek Catholic Archeparchy of Aleppo in Syria.

== Life ==
Athanasios Toutoungi was on July 20, 1927 ordained to the priesthood. His appointment as successor of Basilio Khouri as Archbishop of Homs was on October 1, 1938, and Toutoungi was consecrated on 27 November 1938. In this office he was succeeded by Archbishop Jean Bassoul.

On December 5, 1961 Toutoungi became the successor of Isidore Fattal as Archbishop of Aleppo and held that post until his retirement on March 6, 1968 at the same time he was appointed Titular Archbishop of Tarsus of Greek Melkites and was appointed to his death on February 20, 1981 Archbishop Emeritus of Aleppo, and was succeeded by Néophytos Edelby. Toutoungi took part in all four sessions of the Second Vatican Council (1962-1965). During his tenure, he consecrated Justin Abraham Najmy, BA Bishop of Newton (Massachusetts, USA) and was co-consecrator of the Melkite Archbishops Paul Achkar, Hilarion Capucci and Elias Nijmé.
