= Ain Zhalta =

Ain Zhalta عين زحلتا
- Village
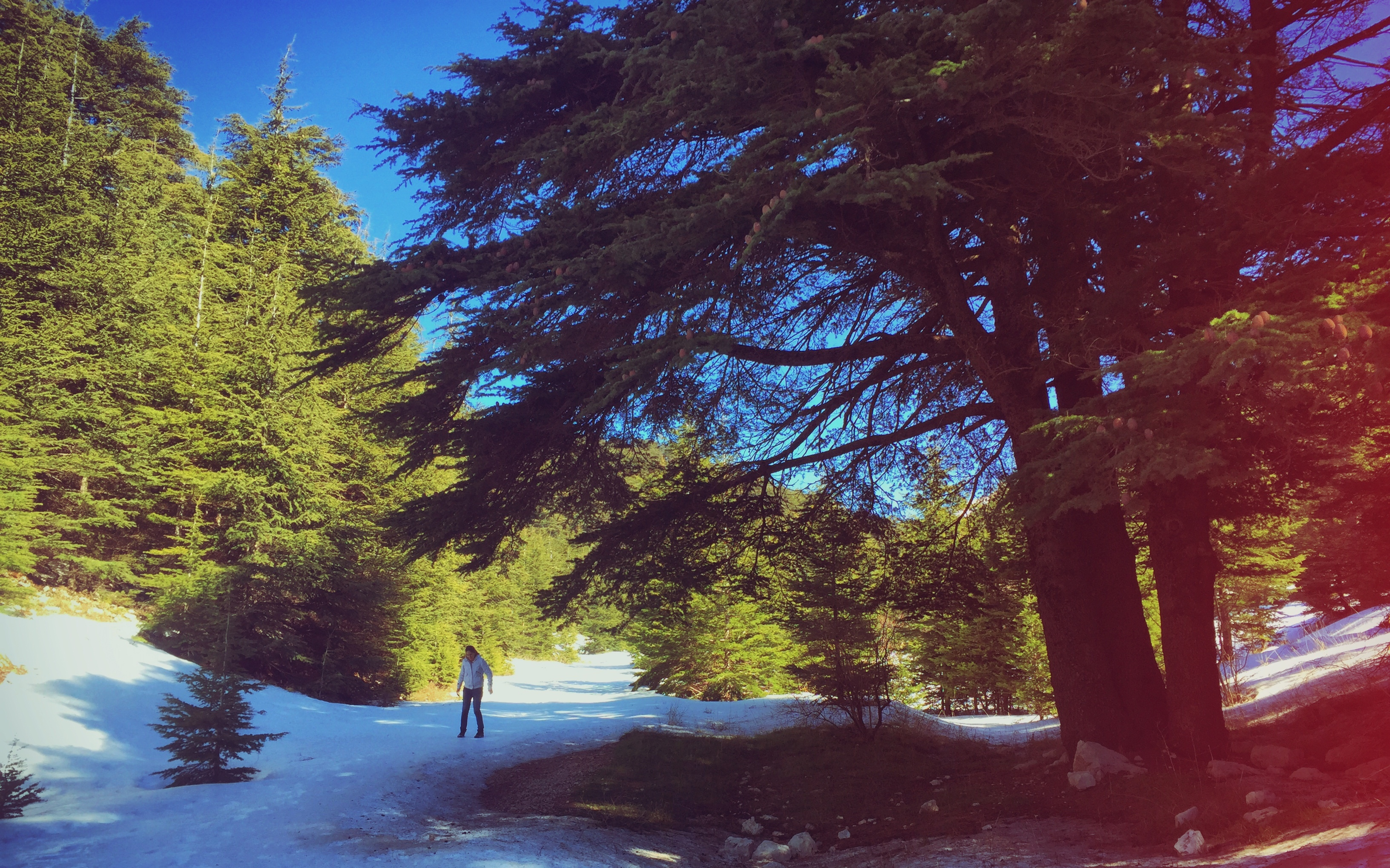

- Location within Lebanon
- Coordinates: 33°44′31″N 35°41′49″E
- Country: Lebanon
- Governorate: Mount Lebanon Governorate
- District: Chouf District
- Time zone: UTC+2 (EET)
  - Summer (DST): UTC+3 (EEST)
- Dialing code: +961

Ain Zhalta (Levantine Arabic: عين زحلتا, romanized: ʿAyn Zḥaltā) is a village in the Chouf District of Mount Lebanon Governorate in southwestern Lebanon. The majority of its inhabitants are Druze.

The Battle of Ain Zhalta was held here in June 1982 with Syria.

Masser Al-Chouf, Barouk, and Ain Zhalta–Bmohary form a biosphere reserve, protected by UNESCO in June 2005.

== Notable people ==
- Cyril IX Moghabghab (1855–1947), Patriarch of the Melkite Greek Catholic Church from 1925 to 1947.
- Naim Moghabghab (1918-1959), Member of Parliament (1953- Reelected 1957), Minister of Public Works. (1955-1956): Renovated & paved all roads in Mount Lebanon; Pumped water to all villages including Aley & Bhamdoon; & helped rebuild houses that had earth roofs. He looked after the welfare of all citizens of all faiths & never asked to be repaid.
