= Clement Bahouth =

Head of the Melkite Greek Catholic Church from 1856 to 1864

- Patriarch of Antioch
- Church: Melkite Greek Catholic Church
- See: Antioch
- Installed: 1 April 1856
- Term ended: 24 September 1864
- Predecessor: Maximos III Mazloum
- Successor: Gregory II Youssef

Orders
- Consecration: 10 August 1836 (Bishop) by Maximos III Mazloum

Personal details
- Born: Michael Bahouth; 1799 near Acre in Palestine
- Died: 13 June 1882 (aged 82–83)

Clement Michael Bahouth (or Clement Bahous, 1799 – 13 June 1882) was patriarch of the Melkite Catholic Church from 1856 until his resignation in 1864.

== Life ==
Michael Bahouth was born in 1799 near Acre. In 1816 he entered in the Holy Saviour monastery of the Basilian Salvatorian Order and professed monastic vows in 1818. He was ordained priest in about 1824. Before 1826 he visited Rome. From 1826 to 1835 he was Melkite chaplain in Livorno, Italy. On 10 August 1836 he was consecrated bishop of Acre by patriarch Maximos III Mazloum, taking the name of Clement.

At the death of patriarch Maximos III Mazloum, the synod of the Melkite Catholic bishops elected Clement Bahouth as patriarch on 1 April 1856. His election was supported by both the bishops partisans of Mazloum's line and by Archbishop Paolo Brunoni, a Cypriot who was the Apostolic Legate of Syria. The same electoral synod, having in mind the last authoritative years of Maximos Mazloum, issued decrees to limit the patriarchal authority. Clement Bahouth's election was confirmed by Pope Pius IX on 16 June 1856.

Clement Bahouth was docile to the demand of Archbishop Paolo Brunoni to Latinize the Eastern Catholic Churches. Without consulting other Melkite bishops, in January 1857 he introduced the Gregorian Calendar in place of the Julian Calendar to promote conformity with the uses of the Latin Rite as well as of the Maronites and of the Syriac Catholic Church; that act caused some discontent within the Melkite Church, and the opposition was led by the Archbishop of Beirut, Agapis Riyasi, the same who led the opposition against Maximos Mazloum some years before. Clement Bahouth, seeing the discontent, resigned in August 1858, but the majority of the Melkite clergy and laity asked Rome to reject Clement's resignation, as it happened in September 1858. The 1859–1860 war between Maronites and Druzes, and the massacre of Christians in Damascus became more important issues than the calendar's one for most of the Melkites. A new player appeared: the Russian Orthodox Church, hoping to expand its influence in the Middle East, persuaded three of the bishops opponent to Clement Bahouth to formalize a schism, known as schism of the sarqiin, creating a new Church separated from both the Melkite Catholic Church and from the Antiochian Orthodox Church. This schism, notwithstanding the funds given by Russia to build churches, ended after a few years, and never numbered more than five thousand adherents.

In 1864 Clement Bahouth asked Rome again to resign and to elect as successor Gregory Youssef, who was appointed bishop of Acre a few years before by Clement himself. This time Rome authorized the resignation, and a synod of bishops was summoned 24 September 1864. At the opening of synod Clement announced his resignation, and the synod in a few days elected Gregory II Youssef according to Clement's wishes. After this synod Clement Bahouth returned to live as a simple novice monk. In 1870 he participated silently at the First Vatican Council. He died on 13 June 1882 in the Holy Saviour monastery, where he was buried.

== See also ==
- Patriarch of Antioch
- List of Melkite Greek Catholic Patriarchs of Antioch

== Notes ==
Catholic Church titles
| Preceded by Maximos III | Patriarch of Antioch; 1856–1864 | Succeeded by Gregory II |
