= Ignatius V Qattan =

Head of the Melkite Greek Catholic Church from 1816 to 1833

- Patriarch of Antioch
- Church: Melkite Greek Catholic Church
- See: Patriarch of Antioch
- Installed: 10 July 1816
- Term ended: 13 March 1833
- Predecessor: Macarius IV Tawil
- Successor: Maximos III Mazloum

Orders
- Consecration: 13 July 1816 (Bishop) by Cyril, Archbishop of Tyre

Personal details
- Born: Moussa Qattan circa 1756 Zouk, Lebanon
- Died: 13 March 1833

Ignatius V Moussa Qattan, (or Cattan, Kattan, Quattan, 1756–1833) was patriarch of the Melkite Greek Catholic Church from 1816 until 1833.

== Life ==
Moussa Qattan was born in 1756 (or 1752) in Zouk, Lebanon. He was the nephew of Soleiman Qattan, who ran the printing press of the monastery of Saint John at Choueir after the death of Abdallah Zakher. Moussa Qattan worked with his uncle in the press. We know that in 1790 Moussa Qattan was a celibate diocesan priest serving in Zouk. His being diocesan priest allowed him to be outsider in the conflict about the two monastic orders that marked the history of the 18th century Melkite Catholic Church.

After the contested election of Michael Mazloum as bishop of Aleppo in 1810 and Mazloum's following dismissal, Moussa Qattan was appointed on 30 May 1811 as Apostolic Administrator of Aleppo. He maintained this ministry until his election as Patriarch.

At the death of Macarius IV Tawil the episcopal synod of the Melkite Catholic Church (composed by only four bishops, the fifth bishop, Mazloum, being in Rome) elected Moussa Qattan as Patriarch, according to the wishes of Aloisio Gandolfi, the Apostolic Legate of Syria. The election occurred on 10 July 1816, and Qattan took the name of Ignatius V. He was ordained bishop on 13 July and enthroned in his town, Zouk, where he preferred to live to maintain a neutral profile. He was confirmed by Rome on 30 May 1817.

His conciliative and gently nature, and later his blindness and paralysis, led him to be a weak Patriarch, subject to bad advisers. He appointed, against the wishes of Rome, Agapis Riyasi (or Riachi) as bishop of Beyrouth. He opposed Mazloum refusing to re-open the Ain Traz Seminary. His administration of the Patriarchate created a situation of crisis and in 1829 all the bishops asked Mazloun to return in Lebanon from Europe, and the Apostolic Legate considered the idea of appoint a patriarchal vicar to rule in place of Ignatius Qattan. Mazloum arrived at Beyrouth in November 1831, and soon the bishops met to decide how to reform the Church, but Mazloum stopped the works of this synod, waiting for the course of the events. Ignatius V Qattan died on 13 March 1833, and on 24 March Mazloum was elected new patriarch with the name of Maximos III.

== Persecutions ==
The patriarchate of Ignatius V Qattan is remembered as a time of persecutions and vexations against the Melkite Catholic Church, that was legally still under the civil authority of the Greek Orthodox Church of Antioch and was not able to defend itself. The violent persecutions halved the Catholic Melkite population of Aleppo and Damascus in about ten years.

The persecutions against the Melkite Catholics were particularly strong in Aleppo in 1817: nine Melkites who were killed in such a year were honored as martyrs, and the Melkites had to leave the cathedral, the metropolitan residence, the library in the hands of the Greek Orthodox who were a minority in the town.

== Sources ==
- Frazee, Charles A. (2006) [1983]. Catholics and Sultans: The Church and the Ottoman Empire 1453-1923. Cambridge: Cambridge University Press. ISBN 9780521027007.

Catholic Church titles
Preceded by Macarius IV	Patriarch of Antioch; 1816-1833	Succeeded by Maximos III
