= Néophytos Edelby =

Néophytos Edelby BA
- Archeparch of Aleppo
- Native name: نيوفيتوس إدلبي
- Church: Melkite Greek Catholic Church
- Archdiocese: Melkite Greek Catholic Archeparchy of Aleppo
- In office: 6 March 1968 – 10 June 1995
- Predecessor: Athanasios Toutoungi
- Successor: Jean-Clément Jeanbart
- Previous posts: Titular Archbishop of Edessa in Osrhoëne dei Greco-Melkiti (1961-1968); Auxiliary Bishop of Antioch (1961-1968)

Orders
- Ordination: 20 July 1944
- Consecration: 25 February 1962 by Maximos IV Sayegh

Personal details
- Born: 10 November 1920 Aleppo, Mandatory State of Aleppo
- Died: 10 June 1995 (aged 74)

Néophytos Edelby (10 November 1920 – 10 June 1995) was a Syrian Melkite Catholic hierarch, who served as an Archbishop of the Melkite Greek Catholic Archeparchy of Aleppo.

== Life ==
Elias (baptismal name) was born in Aleppo as the eldest of six children of Abdallah Edelby and the Armenian Lucie Battouk. After the first school in the Franciscans in Aleppo, he joined at the age of twelve years to the Aleppininan Basilians, where he took his monastic vows in 1936 and was named Neophytos. Then Edelby studied at the Seminary of St. Anne of the White Fathers in Jerusalem. On 20 July 1944 he was appointed and consecrated Chaplain of Aleppinian Basilian. In 1946 he went to further studies at the Pontifical Lateran University in Rome, where he got in 1950 his doctorate utriusque juris. In the following years 1950-1953 Edelby worked as a professor at St. Anne, from 1953-1959 for the Aleppinian Basilians in Lebanon, and from 1959 as the personal assistant of the Patriarch Maximos IV Sayegh.

== Auxiliary bishop in the Patriarchate of Antioch ==
Neophytos Edelby received on 5 December 1961, the appointment as auxiliary bishop of the Melkite Patriarchate of Antiocha, and on 24 December 1961, the simultaneous appointment as Titular Archbishop of Edessa in Osrhoene of Greek Melkites was confirmed. The Patriarch of Antioch Archbishop Maximos IV Sayegh ordained him on February 25, 1962. Bishop Edelby took part from 1962 to 1965 at the four sessions of the Second Vatican Council.

== Archbishop of Aleppo ==
On March 6, 1968 Neophytos Edelby was appointed Archbishop of Aleppo and served in that office until his death on June 10, 1995. During his tenure, he assisted as co-consecrator at:

- Archbishop Nicolas Hajj, SDS, Titular Archbishop of Damietta of Greek Melkites (Auxiliary Bishop of Antioch)
- Archbishop Boutros Raï, BA, for Titular Archbishop of Edessa in Osrhoene of Greek Melkites (Auxiliary Bishop of Antioch)
- Bishop Guerino Dominique Picchi, OFM, titular bishop of Sebaste in Palestine (Vicar Apostolic of Aleppo)
- Archbishop Michel Yatim Archbishop of Latakia in Syria
- Bishop Armando Bortolaso, SDB, titular bishop of Raphanea (Vicar Apostolic of Aleppo)
- Archbishop Isidore Battikha, BA, titular bishop of Pelusium of Greek Melkites (Auxiliary Bishop of Damascus)
- Bishop Antoine Audo, SJ, Bishop of Aleppo of the Chaldean Catholic Church

Pope John Paul II appointed Archbishop Edelby in 1986 member of the Catechism of the Catholic Church Commission. This Commission was for twelve cardinals and bishops; and was chaired by the then Cardinal Joseph Ratzinger. Edelby later was replaced by Bishop Paul Gay Noujeim.

Edelby also edited the works of the Christian Arab poet Sulayman al-Ghazzi whose biography he reconstructed out of his verses.

== Major works ==
- Essai sur l'autonomie legislative jurisdectionelledes chrétiens et d'Orient sous la domination musulmane de 663 à 1517 . Diss. jur. utr. Rome 1950 (typewritten, part publication. Archives d'histoire du droit orientale 1950-51, 307-351).
- Liturgicon. Missel byzantin à l'usage of fidèles. Ed. you renouveau, Beyrouth 1960 (reprint 1991), translated into German.
- Souvenirs du Concile Vatican II (11 octobre 1962-8 décembre 1965). Grec Melkite Catholic Centre de Recherche, Beyrouth of 2003.
- Sulaiman Ibn Hasan Al-Gazzi. Al Diwan. Librairie St-Paul, 1985
- Sulaïmān al-Gazzi. Écrits théologiques en prose. Librairie St-Paul, 1986

== Literature ==
- Nagi Edelby, Pierre Masri (ed.): Mélanges en mémoire de Mgr Neophytos Edelby (1920-1995) (Textes et études sur l'Orient chrétien 4). Cedrac 2005 ISBN 9953-455-30-9.
