= Flavien Khoury =

- Archeparch of Homs
- Church: Melkite Greek Catholic Church
- Archdiocese: Archeparchy of Homs
- In office: 21 November 1901 – 1920
- Predecessor: Gregory Atta
- Successor: Basil Khoury
- Other post: Titular Eparch of Palmyra (since 1920)

Orders
- Consecration: 21 November 1901 by Peter IV Geraigiry

Personal details
- Born: 1859 Khenchara, Double Qaim-Maqamate of Mount Lebanon, Ottoman Empire
- Died: 1920 (aged 60–61)

Flavien Khoury also Flavien Kfoury (1859 in Khenchara – 1920) was Archbishop of the Melkite Greek Catholic Archeparchy of Homs in Syria.

== Life ==
On 21 November 1901, Khoury became the successor of Gregory Atta and was appointed Archbishop of Homs. He was co-consecrator of the Melkite Patriarch Maximos IV Sayegh. In 1920, he became, at the same time appointed Titular Archbishop of Palmyra of Greek Melkites, retired archbishop and died in the same year. He was succeeded by Basil Khoury.
