= Georges Masri =

Syrian Melkite Greek Catholic archbishop (born 1968)

The Most Reverend Georges Masri
- Archbishop of Aleppo
- Church: Melkite Greek Catholic Church
- Archdiocese: Aleppo
- Appointed: 17 September 2021
- Predecessor: Jean-Clément Jeanbart

Orders
- Ordination: 24 April 1999 by Jean-Clément Jeanbart
- Consecration: 27 November 2021 by Youssef Absi, Jean-Clément Jeanbart and Nicolas Antiba

Personal details
- Born: 26 May 1968 (age 57) Aleppo, Syria

Georges Masri (born 26 May 1968) is a Syrian Melkite Catholic hierarch, who has served as the Archbishop of Aleppo since his appointment in 2021.

== Biography ==
=== Early life and priesthood ===
Georges Masri was born on 26 May 1968 in Aleppo, Syria. He began his philosophical and theological studies at St. Anne Patriarchal Seminary in Rabieh, Lebanon, in 1987, but due to political instability and interruptions to his studies, he returned to Aleppo and completed his military service. In 1995, he continued his theological studies at St. Paul Institute in Harissa-Daraoun, Lebanon, and finished them at the Jean-Marie Viannet Seminary in Ars-sur-Formans, France.

He was ordained a priest for the Archeparchy of Aleppo on 24 April 1999. Following his ordination, he served in various pastoral roles within the archeparchy, eventually bbecoming the syncellus and elevated to the rank of archimandrite on 15 August 2013 by Archbishop Jean-Clément Jeanbart.

=== Episcopal ministry ===
On 26 June 2021, the Synod of Bishops of the Melkite Greek Catholic Church elected Masri to succeed the retiring Jean-Clément Jeanbart. Pope Francis granted his assent to the election on 17 September 2021. He was consecrated as an archbishop on 27 November 2021 by Patriarch Youssef Absi, with Jean-Clément Jeanbart and Nicolas Antiba serving as co-consecrators.

As Archbishop, Masri has been vocal regarding the humanitarian crisis in Syria following years of civil conflict and the 2023 earthquake. He has advocated for international aid, highlighting that many Syrians have become too impoverished to afford basic medical surgeries or life-saving operations.
