= Germanos Adam =

18th- and 19-century Melkite Catholic bishop

- Bishop of Aleppo
- Church: Melkite Greek Catholic Church
- See: Aleppo
- Installed: 1777
- Term ended: 10 November 1809
- Predecessor: Ignatius Jerbou'
- Successor: Maximos Mazloum

Orders
- Consecration: 1774

Personal details
- Born: 1725 Aleppo, Syria
- Died: 10 November 1809 (aged 83–84) Zouk Mikael, Lebanon

Germanos Adam (born in 1725 in Aleppo, Syria – died on 10 November 1809 in Zouk Mikael, Lebanon) was the Melkite Catholic bishop of the Archeparchy of Aleppo during the late 18th century and a Christian theologian.

== Life ==
Germanos Adam was born in 1725 in Aleppo, Syria, and studied in the College of the Propaganda in Rome. In December 1774 he was appointed eparch and on December 25 of the same year consecrated Melkite Catholic eparch of Acre by Melkite Patriarch of Antioch, Theodosius V Dahan. In July 1777 he became archbishop of Aleppo, but due to the persecution by the Greek Orthodox Church of Antioch, he dwelt for most of his life in Zouk Mikael, Lebanon. From 1792 to 1798 he traveled in Italy, where he came in contact with Jansenist circles and in particular with Scipione de' Ricci.

When he returned to Syria he was highly esteemed by Patriarch Agapius II Matar and played an important role in the 1806 Melkite Catholic Church's synod in Qarqafe (or Karkafeh).

Germanos Adam died in Zouk Mikael on 10 November 1809.

== Doctrine ==
The doctrine of Germanos Adam was deeply influenced by the theological works of the 18th century Gallicans and Jansenists (like Febronius), which he read during his studies in Rome, and mainly by his 1792-8 travel in Italy where he became friend of the Jansenist Scipione de' Ricci. Consequently, in his 1799 book Réponse de Mgr Germanos Adam, évêque d'Alep et de ses environs à l'ouvrage intitulé: Voix des Pères missionaires consultés par S. S. le patriarche Mar-Ignace-Michel, patriarche syrien d'Antioche (1), le tout bienheureux, et par Mgr Ignace, le très respectable évêque de Beyrouth, Adam supported the doctrine of Conciliarism, and stated that the papal authority was more honorary than actual. Further he affirmed that an explicit epiclesis was essential in the Eucharistic consecration, a statement that implied the invalidity of the Mass as celebrated in the Latin liturgical rites of the Latin Church.

His works were attacked by the Maronite Patriarch Joseph Tyan who in March 1801 wrote an encyclical to his faithfuls against Adam's ideas, but the Melkite Patriarch Agapius II Matar in June 1801 defended the doctrine of Adam as correct. Moreover, Germanos Adam wrote a catechism that was used for popular instruction. Adam's doctrine was confirmed by the 1806 Melkite Synod of Qarqafe, which acts were signed also by Patriarch Joseph Tyen and by Aloisio Gandolfi, the Apostolic Legate.

The next years were marked by the reaction to his ideas. Adam himself made amends for the sacramental part of his work and before he died he humbly submitted all his works to Rome for examination. In 1812 a formal condemnation of the Jansenist and Gallican doctrine, issued by Propaganda Fide, was signed by all the Eastern Catholic Churches. On 3 June 1816 Pope Pius VII condemned Adam's works and his catechism. The actions of the 1806 Melkite Synod of Qarqafe were finally condemned by the Apostolic Letter Melchitarum Catholicorum Synodus (English: Of the synod of Melkite Catholics) issued by Pope Gregory XVI on 3 June 1835.

== Sources ==
- Frazee, Charles A. (2006) [1983]. Catholics and Sultans: The Church and the Ottoman Empire 1453–1923. Cambridge: Cambridge University Press. ISBN 978-0-521-02700-7.
