= Ignatius IV Sarrouf =

Head of the Melkite Greek Catholic Church in 1812

- Patriarch of Antioch
- Church: Melkite Greek Catholic Church
- See: Patriarch of Antioch
- Installed: 15 February 1812
- Term ended: 16 November 1812
- Predecessor: Agapius II Matar
- Successor: Athanasius V Matar

Orders
- Ordination: 1773 (Priest)
- Consecration: 8 July 1778 (Bishop) by Theodosius V Dahan

Personal details
- Born: Youssef Sarrouf; 1742 Damascus
- Died: 16 November 1812 (aged 69–70)

Ignatius IV (Youssef) Sarrouf (or Aganatios Sarruf, 1742–1812) was Patriarch of the Melkite Greek Catholic Church in 1812. He is remembered for both his patriarchate (short and ended by his murder), and for having been, as metropolitan of Beirut, a leading figure in the early history of the Melkite Church.

== Life ==
=== Early life ===
Youssef Sarrouf was born in 1742 in Damascus. In 1756 he entered in the Basilian Chouerite Order, being the only monk born in Damascus. On 15 August 1758 he made the solemn vows taking the name of Ignatius. In 1764 he was ordained deacon and in 1773 he was ordained priest. From 1773 for five years he was in Damascus where he became distinguished for his sermons and for raising funds for the patriarch. On 8 July 1778 Ignatius (Youssef) Sarrouf was consecrated metropolitan bishop of Beirut by Patriarch Theodosius V Dahan.

=== Bishop of Beirut ===
His years as metropolitan of Beirut were marked by his attempt to reform the two Melkite monastic orders: the Basilian Salvatorian Order and particularly the Basilian Chouerite Order where he came from and that had its headquarters in his diocese. The discipline of this order was actually relaxed, and the monks, who run many parishes, considered themselves almost outside the jurisdiction of their own bishop. Sarrouf made a first attempt of reform in 1782, imposing a rule of ten points on the monks, who rejected it. In his efforts of disciplining the monasteries, he antagonized many bishops, all monks, and particularly Germanos Adam bishop of Aleppo who took the part of the monks, even if outside his jurisdiction. A visit of an Apostolic Legate in 1784 settled the issue for some years. The dispute reappeared in 1790 with Patriarch Athanasius IV Jawhar on the side of Ignatius Sarrouf against Germanos Adam on the side of the monks. The death of Athanasius Jawhar in 1794 left the issue unresolved. In 1796, seeing the impossibility of obtaining a disciplinary reform of the monastic orders, Ignatius Sarrouf founded his an own monastic order, the Order of Saint Simeon Stylites near Baskinta. This foundation was strongly contested by the synod of Zouk Mikael in 1797 led by his opponents: the new Patriarch Agapius II Matar and Germanos Adam. Sarrouf in obedience accepted the resolution of the synod but appealed to Rome. Other clashes arose between Sarrouf and patriarch Agapios II Matar: for example in 1798 the patriarch created the new diocese of Gebail from a part of the diocese of Beirut and appointed a Chouerite monk, Clement Badra, to govern it. Sarrouf refused to leave the district. All these issues were taken to Rome that confirmed the dismissal of the Order of Saint Simeon, confirmed the creation of the diocese of Gebail (with the agreement that at the death of Clement Badra it returned under Beirut), but supported Sarrouf in enforcing his ten points of disciplinary reform for the monasteries (even if without success). For the above reasons, in 1810 Ignatius Sarrouf, with other three bishops, strongly opposed the appointment of Maximos Mazloum, the pupil of Germanos Adam, as bishop of Aleppo by Patriarch Agapios II Matar.

=== Patriarch ===
After the death of Agapios II Matar, two candidates competed for the election of the new Patriarch: the young Maximos Mazloum, leader of the party which harked back to Germanos Adam and to the previous patriarch Agapios II Matar, and Ignatius Sarrouf, already 70, supported by the missionaries and by Aloisio Gandolfi, the Apostolic Legate of Syria. A compromise was brokered: Maximus Mazloum remained superior of the seminary established in Ain Traz and on 12 February 1812 Ignatius Sarrouf was elected Patriarch, and confirmed immediately by Rome. He had not the time to take a formal position against Germanos Adam and Maximos Mazloum because he was murdered by a Melkite layperson on 16 November 1812 for unknown reasons. He was succeeded by Athanasius V Matar, brother of the previous patriarch Agapios II Matar and partisan of Mazloum's party.

== Notes ==
Catholic Church titles
Preceded by Agapius II	Patriarch of Antioch of the Melkites; 1794–1796	Succeeded by Athanasius V
