= Gregory II Youssef =

Head of the Melkite Greek Catholic Church from 1864 to 1897

- Patriarch of Antioch
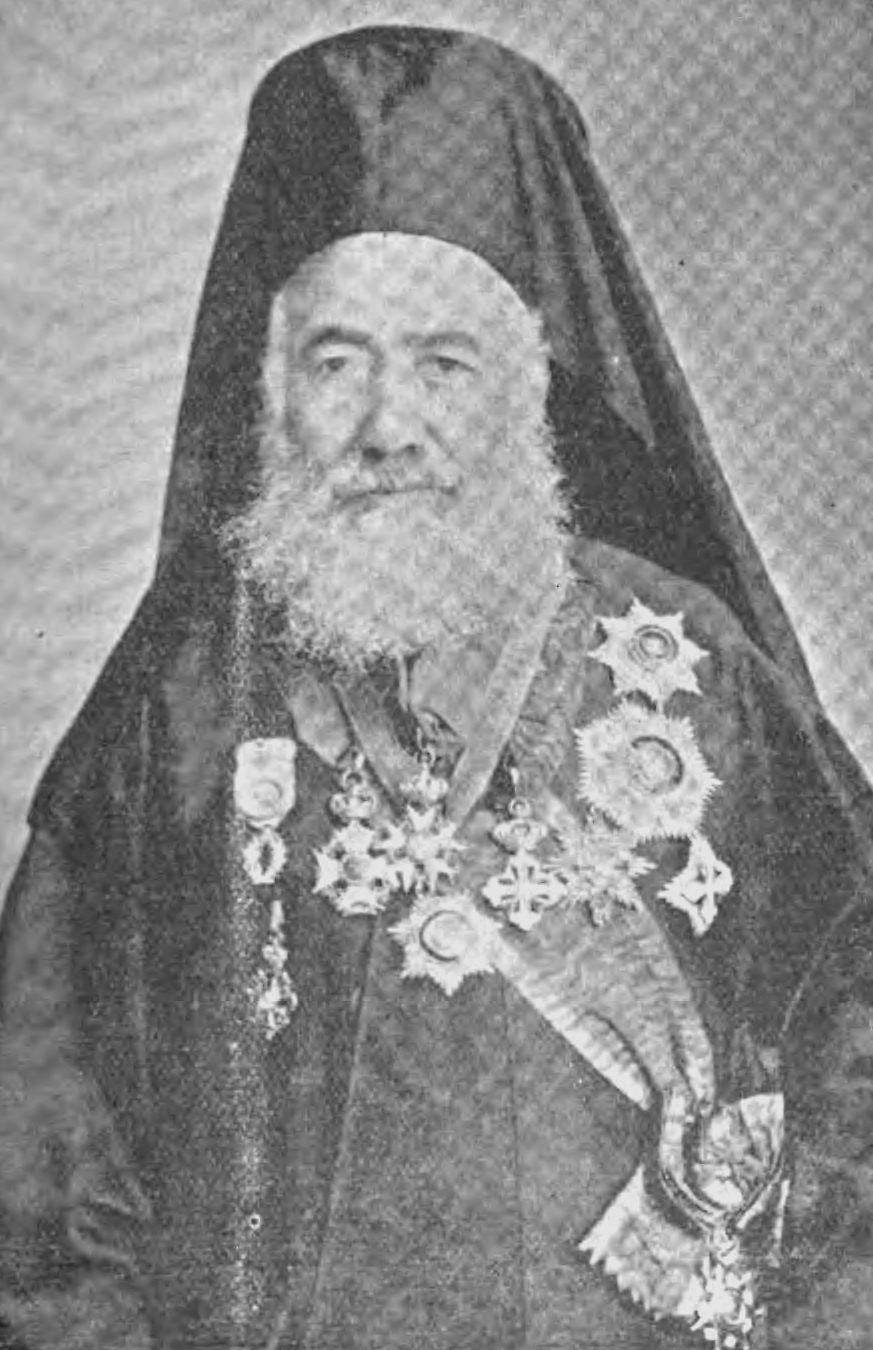
- Church: Melkite Greek Catholic Church
- See: Antioch
- Installed: September 29, 1864
- Term ended: July 13, 1897
- Predecessor: Clement Bahouth
- Successor: Peter IV Geraigiry

Orders
- Ordination: June 11, 1854 (Priest)
- Consecration: November 13, 1856 (Bishop) by Clement Bahouth

Personal details
- Born: Hanna Youssef-Sayour; October 17, 1823 near Alexandria, Egypt
- Died: July 13, 1897 (aged 73) Damascus

Patriarch Gregory II Youssef, also known as Gregory II Hanna Youssef-Sayour (October 17, 1823 – July 13, 1897), was Patriarch of the Melkite Greek Catholic Church from 1864 to 1897. Gregory expanded and modernized the church and its institutions and participated in the First Vatican Council, where he championed the rights of the Eastern Catholic Churches.

Gregory is remembered as a particularly dynamic patriarch of the Melkite Church. He is recognized as one of the forerunners of interconfessional dialogue and as an advocate for preserving the traditions and autonomy of the Melkites.

== Early life, priesthood and episcopate ==
Hanna Youssef-Sayour was born October 17, 1823, at Rosetta, near Alexandria, Egypt. In 1840, at age 16, he entered the Basilian Salvatorian Order. In 1844, he began to study in the Jesuit seminary of Kesrouane in Mount Lebanon. From 1847 to 1856 Youssef studied philosophy and theology in the Pontifical Greek College of Saint Athanasius in Rome, where he was ordained priest on June 11, 1854. Back in the Middle East, he was chosen by the newly elected patriarch Clement Bahouth as successor for the See of Acre and Galilee. He received the episcopal consecration on November 13, 1856, by patriarch Clement Bahouth.

During his episcopate Youssef faced three major issues: discontent within the Melkite Church for the introduction of the Gregorian Calendar by Clement Bahouth, a short-lived schism supported by the Russian Orthodox Church on the basis of the newly introduced Gregorian Calendar, and division between the Basilians monks. Youssef remained strictly neutral on the calendar, but fiercely fought the schism.

== Patriarchate ==
The conflicts in the Melkite church escalated and in 1864 Clement Bahouth asked the church leadership in Rome to abdicate his position as patriarch and elect Youssef as his successor. Rome authorized the resignation, and a synod of bishops was convened for September 24, 1864. At the opening of the synod Clement Bahouth announced his resignation, and the synod elected Youssef as patriarch on September 29, 1864. Youssef took the name Gregory and was confirmed by Pope Pius IX on March 27, 1865.

Once elected, patriarch Gregory worked to restore peace in the religious community and successfully healed the schism. He also focused on improving church institutions and founded the Patriarchal College in Beirut in 1865 and the Patriarchal College in Damascus in 1875, and re-opened the Melkite seminary of Ain Traz in 1866. Gregory promoted the establishment of Saint Anne's Seminary in Jerusalem by the White Fathers in 1882 for the training of Melkite clergy.

Following the Hatti Humayyouni decree by Sultan Abdul Majid in 1856 the life of Christians in the Near East improved. This allowed Gregory to successfully encourage greater participation by the Melkite laity in both church administration and public affairs. Gregory also took an interest in ministering to the growing number of Melkites who had emigrated to the Americas. In 1889, he dispatched Father Ibrahim Beshawate of the Basilian Salvatorian Order in Sidon, Lebanon, to New York to minister to the growing local Syrian community. According to historian Philip Hitte, Beshawate was the first permanent priest in the United States from the Near East from the Melkite, Maronite, and Antiochian Orthodox Churches.

== First Vatican Council ==
Gregory was a prominent proponent of Eastern ecclesiology at the First Vatican Council. In two discourses he gave at the Council on May 19 and June 14, 1870, he emphasized the importance of conforming to the decisions of the Council of Florence and of not innovating ideas of papal primacy, such as papal infallibility. He anticipated a negative impact of a dogmatic definition of papal infallibility on relations with the Eastern Orthodox Church and became a prominent opponent of the dogma at the Council. Gregory also defended the rights and privileges of the patriarchs afforded by earlier ecumenical councils. Speaking at the Council on May 19, 1870, Gregory stated:

The Eastern Church attributes to the pope the most complete and highest power, however in a manner where the fullness and primacy are in harmony with the rights of the patriarchal sees. This is why, in virtue of and ancient right founded on customs, the Roman Pontiffs did not, except in very significant cases, exercise over these sees the ordinary and immediate jurisdiction that we are asked now to define without any exception. This definition would completely destroy the constitution of the entire Greek church. That is why my conscience as a pastor refuses to accept this constitution.

Gregory refused to sign the Council's dogmatic declaration on papal infallibility. He and two of the seven other Melkite bishops present voted non placet at the general congregation and left Rome prior to the adoption of the dogmatic constitution Pastor aeternus on papal infallibility. Other members of the anti-infallibilist minority from the Latin church and other Eastern Catholic churches also left the city.

== Relationship with the Vatican following the Council ==
After the First Vatican Council concluded, an emissary of the Roman Curia was dispatched to secure the signatures of the patriarch and the Melkite delegation. Gregory and the Melkite bishops subscribed to it, but added the qualifying clause used at the Council of Florence: "except the rights and privileges of Eastern patriarchs." He earned the enmity of Pope Pius IX for this; during his next visit to the pontiff before leaving Rome, when Gregory was kneeling, the Pope placed his knee on the patriarch's shoulder, saying to him, "Testa dura!" ("Hardheaded!").

In spite of this event, Gregory and the Melkite Catholic Church remained committed to their union with the Holy See. Relationships with the Vatican improved following the death of Pius IX and the subsequent election of Pope Leo XIII. Leo's encyclical Orientalium dignitas in 1894 addressed some of the Eastern Catholic Churches' concerns on latinization and the centralization of power in Rome. Leo confirmed that the limitations placed on the Armenian Catholic patriarch by Pius IX's 1867 letter Reversurus would not apply to the Melkite Church and he formally recognized an expansion of Patriarch Gregory's jurisdiction to include all Melkites throughout the Ottoman Empire.

Patriarch Gregory died on July 13, 1897, in Damascus. Following his death he was succeeded as patriarch by Barakat Géraigiry, who assumed the name Peter IV.

== Legacy ==
Gregory is remembered as a particularly dynamic patriarch of the Melkite Church. His defense of the Eastern ecclesiological conception of church autonomy established the framework for the Eastern Catholic Church's interventions during the Second Vatican Council. Gregory has also been recognized as one of the forerunners of interconfessional dialogue.

== See also ==
- Patriarch of Antioch
- List of Melkite Greek Catholic Patriarchs of Antioch

== Notes ==
Catholic Church titles
Preceded by Clement	Patriarch of Antioch; 1864–1897	Succeeded by Peter IV
