= Dionysius Kfoury =

- Patriarchal Vicar of Egypt and Sudan
- Native name: ديونيسيوس كفورى
- Church: Melkite Greek Catholic Church
- Archdiocese: Melkite Patriarchal Vicariate of Egypt and Sudan
- In office: 5 June 1932 – 27 August 1954
- Predecessor: Anthony Farage
- Successor: Elias Zoghby
- Other post: Titular Bishop of Tarsus dei Greco-Melkiti (1927-1965)

Orders
- Ordination: 6 August 1904
- Consecration: 9 December 1926 by Cyril IX Moghabghab

Personal details
- Born: 5 December 1879
- Died: 11 March 1965 (aged 85)

Dionysius Kfoury, BS (Arabic: ديونيسيوس كفورى; 5 December 1879 in Khonsarah, Syria – 11 March 1965) was a bishop of the Patriarchal Vicariate of Egypt and Sudan.

== Life ==
Dionysius Kfoury was on August 6, 1904, ordained to the priesthood. On 9 December 1926, he was appointed Auxiliary Bishop of Antioch, and on the same day as the Titular Archbishop. On 20 June 1927 Kfoury was named Titular Archbishop of Tarsus of Greek Melkites. His ordination was performed by Melkite Patriarch of Antioch Cyril IX Moghabghab, and his co-consecrators were Basilio Cattan of Beirut and Byblos and Bishop Melezio Abou-Assaleh of Baalbek in Lebanon.

From 1932 to 1954 he was in the office of Patriarchal Vicar of Alexandria and successor of Anthony Farage. He was co-consecrator of Archbishop Elias Zoghby of Baalbek, which was also in the adjoining office Patriarchal Vicar of Alexandria.
