= Cyril IX Moghabghab =

Head of the Melkite Greek Catholic Church from 1925 to 1947

- Patriarch of Antioch
- Church: Melkite Greek Catholic Church
- See: Patriarch of Antioch
- Installed: December 8, 1925
- Term ended: September 8, 1947
- Predecessor: Demetrius I Qadi
- Successor: Maximos IV Sayegh

Orders
- Ordination: Mar 27, 1883 (Priest)
- Consecration: May 28, 1899 (Bishop) by Peter IV Geraigiry

Personal details
- Born: October 29, 1855 Ain Zhalta, Mount Lebanon Mutasarrifate, Ottoman Empire (modern-day Lebanon)
- Died: September 8, 1947 (aged 91) Alexandria, Egypt

Cyril IX Moghabghab (October 29, 1855 – September 8, 1947) served as Patriarch of Antioch and All the East, and Alexandria and Jerusalem of the Melkite Greek Catholic Church from 1925 to 1947.

== Life ==
Patriarch Cyril was born in Ain Zhalta, Mount Lebanon Mutasarrifate, on October 29, 1855. He was ordained a priest on March 27, 1883. Later, on April 23, 1899, he was elected eparch of Zahlé, Lebanon, confirmed on May 20, 1899 and consecrated eparch on May 28 of the same year by patriarch Peter IV Geraigiry. He was one of the first Melkite bishops to visit the Americas when, in 1904, he came to Brazil. He succeeded Demetrius I Qadi as patriarch of the Melkite Greek Catholic Church on December 8, 1925 and the Pope accepted his request for ecclesiastical communion on June 21, 1926. He also served as the spiritual protector of international ecumenical Military and Hospitaller Order of St. Lazarus of Jerusalem.

Patriarch Cyril died on September 8, 1947, and was succeeded by Maximos IV Sayegh.

== Co-consecrator of Melkite Eparchs ==
During his tenure as patriarch he was co-consecrator of the following eparchs:

- Dionysius Kfoury, BS - Auxiliary bishop of Antioch and Titular bishop of Tarsus dei Greco-Melkiti
- Eftimios Youakim, BS - Eparch of Zahle and Furzol
- Gabriel Nabaa, BS - Eparch of Sidon
- Agapios Salomon Naoum, BS - Archbishop of Tyre
- Maximos V Hakim - Eparch of Akka.

== Distinctions ==
- Order of Saint Lazarus (statuted 1910)

== See also ==
- Melkite Greek Catholic Patriarchate of Antioch and All the East
- Melkite Greek Catholic Church

== Notes ==
Catholic Church titles
Preceded by Demetrius I	Patriarch of Antioch; 1925-1947	Succeeded by Maximos IV
