= Flavien Ranaivo =

Malagasy poet and writer (1914–1999)

Flavien Ranaivo (Arivonimamo, 13 May 1914 - Troyes 20 December 1999) was a Malagasy poet and journalist.

== Life ==
His family was noble, and he spent most of his life in contact with nature. His works are influenced by Malagasy ballad and song forms, in particular the hain-teny. Ranaivo also held important civic and government posts.

== Works ==
- L'ombre et le vent (1947)
- Mes chansons de toujours (1955)
- Le retour au bercail (1962)
- Littérature magache (1956)
- Images de Madagascar (1968)
