= Cyril VIII Geha =

Head of the Melkite Greek Catholic Church from 1902 to 1916

- Patriarch of Antioch
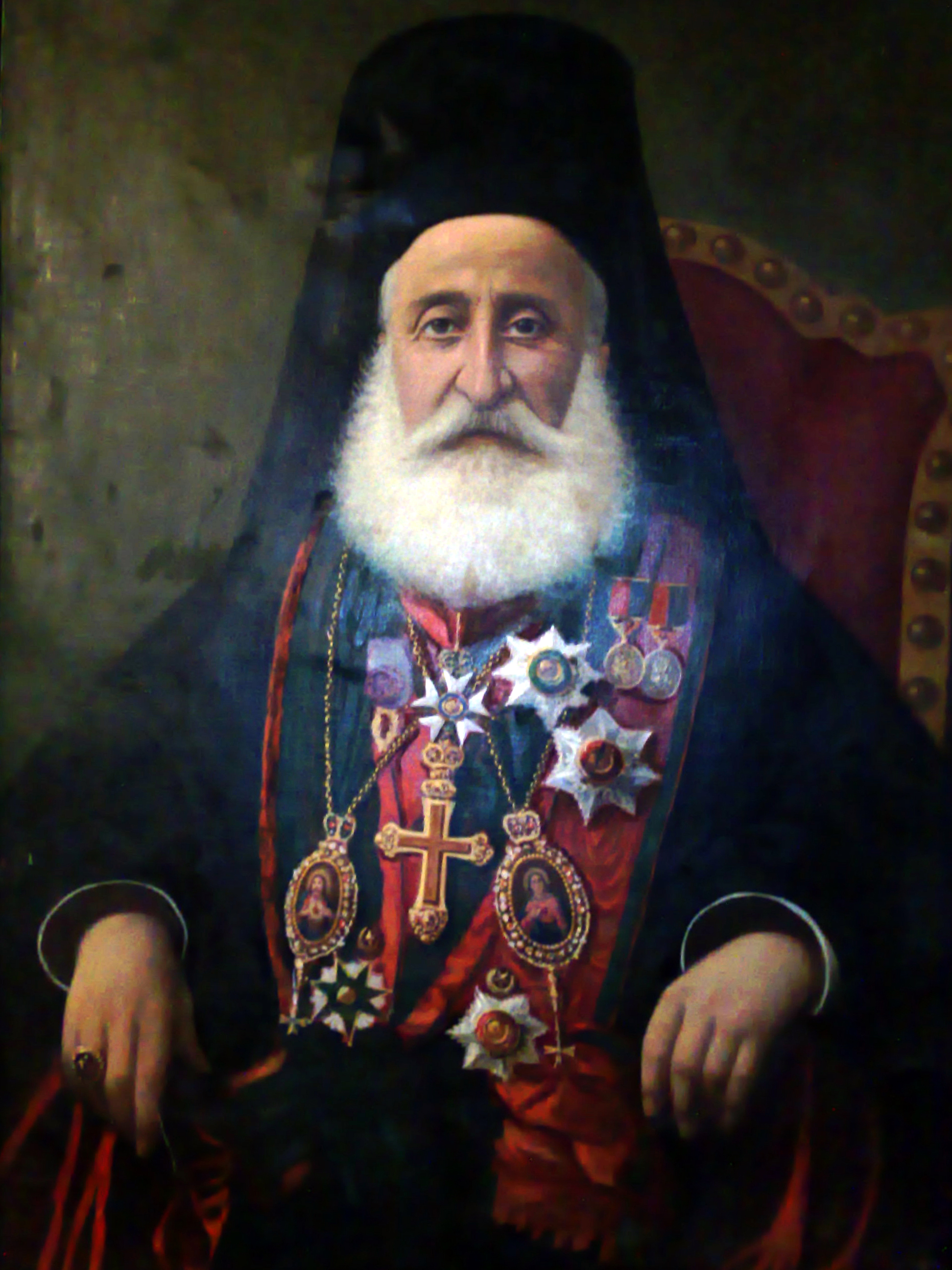
- Church: Melkite Greek Catholic Church
- See: Patriarch of Antioch
- Installed: June 29, 1902
- Term ended: January 11, 1916
- Predecessor: Peter IV Geraigiry
- Successor: Demetrius I Qadi

Orders
- Consecration: May 3, 1885 (Bishop) by Gregory II Youssef

Personal details
- Born: November 26, 1840 Aleppo, Syria
- Died: January 11, 1916 (aged 75) Cairo, Egypt

Cyril VIII Geha (or Jeha), (November 26, 1840 – January 11, 1916) was patriarch of the Melkite Greek Catholic Church from 1902 until 1916. He was the last Melkite Catholic patriarch of the Ottoman era.

== Life ==
Geha was born in Aleppo, Syria in 1840, he was consecrated the Melkite Catholic Archbishop of Aleppo on May 3, 1885 by patriarch Gregory II Youssef. On June 29, 1902 he became patriarch of the Melkites.

In 1909 Cyril convoked a synod at Ain Traz to develop the disciplinary legislation of the Melkite Church. However, the work of the synod failed to gain confirmation from Pope Pius X, who lacked the desire of his predecessor, Pope Leo XIII, to promote the traditional rights and privileges of the Eastern Churches.

Upon Cyril's death in 1916 the patriarchal see was vacant until the election of Demetrius I Qadi in 1919.

== Distinctions ==
- Order of Saint Lazarus (statuted 1910)

== See also ==
- List of Melkite Greek Catholic Patriarchs of Antioch

== Notes ==
Catholic Church titles
Preceded by Peter IV	Patriarch of Antioch; 1902–1916	Succeeded by Demetrius I
