= Peter IV Geraigiry =

Head of the Melkite Greek Catholic Church from 1898 to 1902

Peter IV Géraigiry
- Patriarch of Antioch
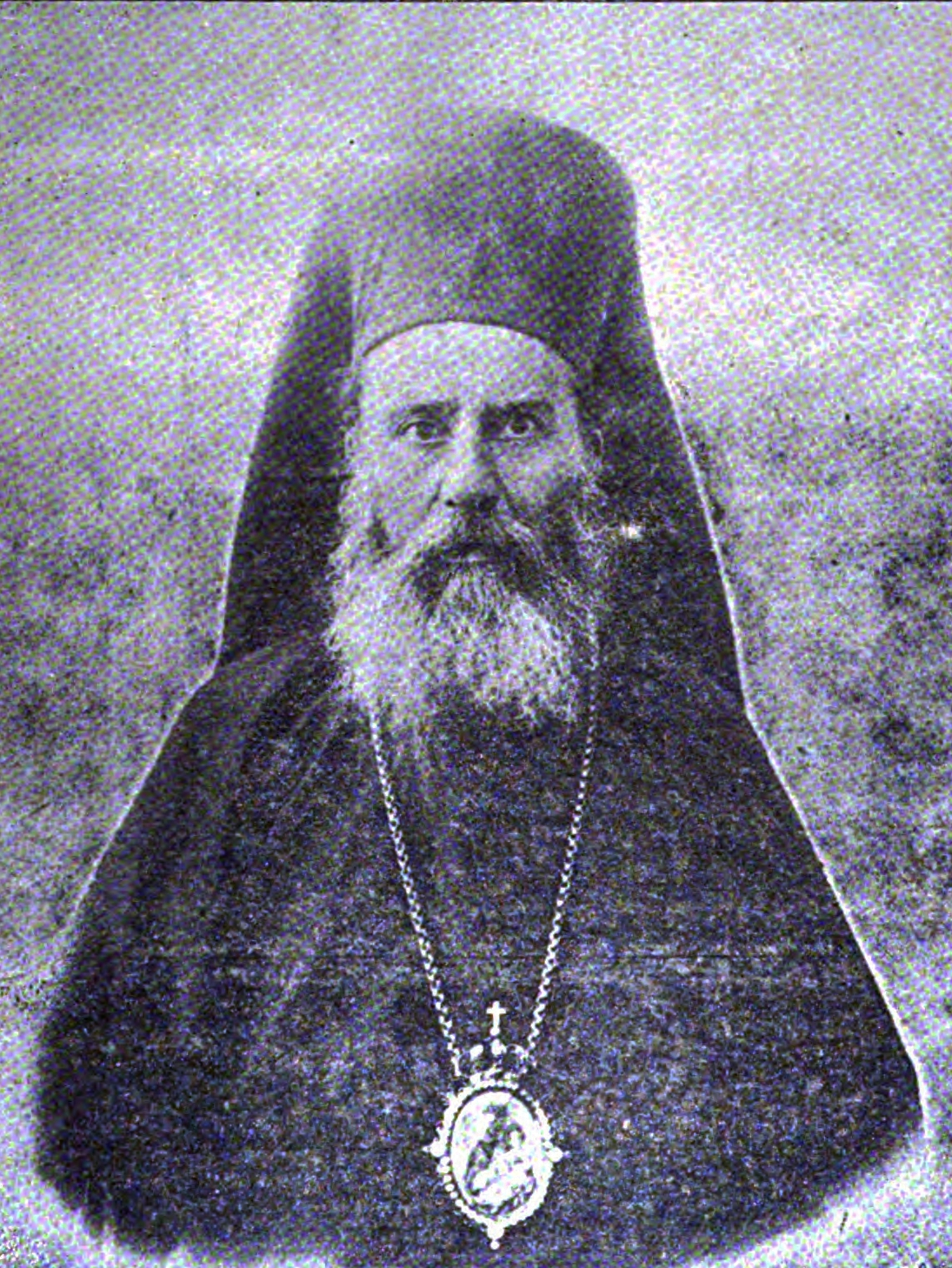
- Church: Melkite Greek Catholic Church
- See: Patriarch of Antioch
- Installed: February 24, 1898
- Term ended: April 24, 1902
- Predecessor: Gregory II Youssef
- Successor: Cyril VIII Jaha

Orders
- Ordination: March 16, 1862 (Priest)
- Consecration: Febr 21, 1886 (Bishop) by Gregory II Youssef

Personal details
- Born: Barakat Géraigiry; August 6, 1841 Zahlé, Lebanon
- Died: April 24, 1902 (aged 60) Beirut

Peter IV Barakat Géraigiry (or Jraijiry, 1841–1902) was patriarch of the Melkite Greek Catholic Church from 1898 until 1902.

== Life ==
Born in Zahlé, Lebanon on August 6, 1841, Géraigiry was ordained priest on March 16, 1862, with a special permission due to his young age. He soon set up an elementary school in Zahle and became a teacher in the patriarchal college of Beirut. From 1874 to 1878 he studied theology in France. When he returned to Lebanon he became director of the schools of his diocese. In 1882 Géraigiry was appointed delegate of the Patriarch and thus he traveled to Rome, Paris, Istanbul.

On February 21, 1886, patriarch Gregory II Youssef consecrated bishop Géraigiry and appointed him responsible of the newly created diocese of Paneas, where he set up twenty-three Christian schools.

After the lengthy and eventful reign of Gregory II Youssef, on February 24, 1898, Géraigiry was appointed patriarch of the Melkites following his election by the Melkite synod of bishops. Although his election was considered null by the Roman Congregation of Propaganda Fide, Pope Leo XIII confirmed it shortly later. The four years of his reign were marked by crisis. Some discontent arose from appointments of bishops taken without consulting the synod, and from his attempt to move the Patriarchal See from Damascus to Beirut. Also his relations with the Congregation of Propaganda Fide were often tense, mainly because Rome wanted him to summon a synod to define in details the powers and the autonomy of the patriarch and of all the Melkite clergy, while Géraigiry hesitated and took time. The synod never met under his reign.

Peter IV Géraigiry died in Beirut on April 24, 1902.

== See also ==
- Melkite Christianity in Lebanon

== Notes ==
Catholic Church titles
Preceded by Gregory II	Patriarch of Antioch; 1898–1902	Succeeded by Cyril VIII
