= Maximos III Mazloum =

Head of the Melkite Greek Catholic Church from 1833 to 1855

- Patriarch of Antioch
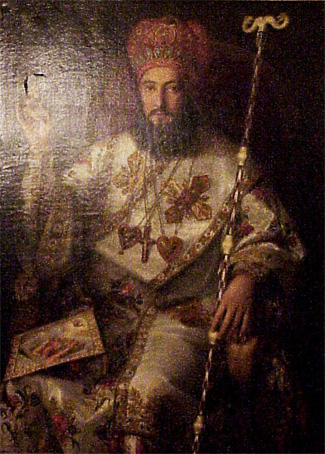
- Church: Melkite Greek Catholic Church
- See: Antioch
- Installed: March 24, 1833
- Term ended: August, 1855
- Predecessor: Ignatius V Qattan
- Successor: Clement Bahouth

Orders
- Ordination: 1806 (Priest)
- Consecration: August 5, 1810 (Bishop) by Agapius II Matar

Personal details
- Born: Michael Mazloum; November 1779 Aleppo, Syria
- Died: August 1855 (aged 75)

Maximos III Michael Mazloum (born in November 1779 in Aleppo, present Syria – died in August 1855) was patriarch of the Melkite Greek Catholic Church from 1833 until 1855. As patriarch he reformed church administration and bolstered clerical education. He was also the first Melkite patriarch granted civil authority by the Ottoman Empire when the Melkites were recognized as a unique millet.

== Life ==
Born in Aleppo, Syria in November 1779, Mazloum was ordained priest in 1806. Mazloum was a protégé of Germanos Adam, the Melkite Archbishop of Aleppo. Adam, a theologian, was wary of the Latinizing influence of Western missionaries and championed the rights of the Melkite Church but also was taken by the Jansenist ideas of Scipione de' Ricci and not liked by the Latin missionaries of Aleppo because of litigations on properties. As a consequence, in June 1810 Rome opposed the elevation of Mazloum as Adam's successor in Aleppo. But Michael Mazloum was elected bishop of Aleppo on July 26, 1810, and consecrated bishop on August 5, 1810, by patriarch Agapius II Matar, taking the name of Maximos.

His appointment as bishop of Aleppo was contested by the Propaganda Fide (and by Ignatius IV Sarrouf, Archbishop of Beirut and future patriarch). In May 1811, a compromise was reached: Mazloum was offered the position of superior of the first Melkite seminary established in Ain Traz. In 1814 Mazloum was sent to Rome by the Melkite Episcopal Synod to appeal his dismissal from the See of Aleppo: Pope Pius VII on July 24, 1814, rejected the appeal and asked Mazloum (who was given the titular title of Myra) to remain in Europe. Mazloum remained in Europe until 1831, living mainly in Rome, and endearing himself to the Roman Curia because of his untiring efforts in aid of the Melkites.

From 1817 to 1823 Mazloum traveled in France and in Vienna. In 1819 he petitioned the Catholic authorities to lean on the Ottoman Empire to stop the persecutions of the Greek Orthodox Church of Antioch against the Catholic Melkites. He spent time translating spiritual and theological books, and in 1821 founded the Greek Catholic parish of St. Nicholas in Marseille, France, for Melkites. He returned to the East in 1831.

On March 24, 1833, he was elected patriarch of the Melkites. In 1834 he entered in Damascus, whence his predecessor Cyril VI Tanas had to escape because of religious persecutions. On October 31, 1837, he was recognized by the Ottoman Empire as the civil authority of a millet, a distinctive religious community within the Empire, thus obtaining civic emancipation for his Church. In 1838 Pope Gregory XVI granted him the titles of Patriarch of Alexandria and Jerusalem, and from then on the title held by the leader of the Melkite Church is Patriarch of Antioch and All the East, of Alexandria and Jerusalem of the Melkite Greek Catholic Church.

His action as patriarch was strong (he was named "untiring fighter"): he carried on a legislative reform of Church (synods of 1835 and 1849) and reformed the religious instruction, giving also new life to the patriarchal Ain Traz Seminary.

As patriarch he resided in Beirut until his death in 1855.

== See also ==
- Patriarch of Antioch
- List of Melkite Greek Catholic Patriarchs of Antioch

== Notes ==
Catholic Church titles
Preceded by Ignatius V	Patriarch of Antioch; 1833–1855	Succeeded by Clement
