= Agapius II Matar =

Head of the Melkite Greek Catholic Church from 1796 to 1812

- Patriarch of Antioch
- Church: Melkite Greek Catholic Church
- See: Patriarch of Antioch
- Installed: 11 September 1796
- Term ended: 2 February 1812
- Predecessor: Cyril VII Siaj
- Successor: Ignatius IV Sarrouf

Orders
- Consecration: 1795 (Bishop) by Cyril VII Siaj

Personal details
- Born: Agapius Matar; 1736 Damascus, Syria
- Died: 2 February 1812 (aged 75–76) Ain Traz, Lebanon

Agapius II Matar, (sometime also known as Agapios III, 1736–1812) was Patriarch of the Melkite Greek Catholic Church from 1796 to 1812.

== Life ==
Agapius Matar was born in 1736 in Damascus. He entered young in the Basilian Salvatorian Order. In 1779, when he was already a priest, he traveled to Rome and later to Paris. In 1789 he was appointed Superior of the Basilian Salvatorian Order and in 1795 he was appointed and consecrated bishop of Saida by Patriarch Cyril VII Siaj. On 11 September 1796 he was elected Patriarch.

The first problem Agapius Matar had to face as Patriarch were the clashes with the metropolitan of Beirut (see Article Ignatius IV Sarrouf) that saw Agapius Matar allied with Germanos Adam bishop of Aleppo in rejecting the disciplinary reform (and later the new foundation) of the monastic orders promoted by Sarrouf and by the Latin missionaries.

In those years the Melkite Church was in pursuit of its identity with regard to Rome. Agapius Matar asked and obtained from Propaganda Fide to forbid to the Franciscans to promote their Third order among Melkites, and later he obtained from Rome to forbid to the Custodian of the Holy Land to confer the sacrament of Confirmation on faithfuls not of Latin Rite. In 1806 he summoned a synod in Qarqafe (or Karkafeh) that lined up with the ecclesiological and sacramental doctrine of Germanos Adam, despite the fact that it was marked by Jansenist ideas. The acts of the Qarqafe's synod were later rejected by Maximos III Mazloum and condemned by Pope Gregory XVI with his brief Melchitarum catholicorum of 3 June 1835.

After the death of Germanos Adam he appointed as bishop of Aleppo, against the wishes of Ignatius Sarrouf and of other bishops, the young Adam's secretary, Maximos Mazloum. In 1811 Agapius Matar founded the seminary of Ain Traz to teach the diocesan priests. He died there on 2 February 1812.

== Sources ==
- Frazee, Charles A. (2006) [1983]. Catholics and Sultans: The Church and the Ottoman Empire 1453–1923. Cambridge: Cambridge University Press. ISBN 9780521027007.

Catholic Church titles
Preceded by Cyril VII	Patriarch of Antioch; 1796-1812	Succeeded by Ignatius IV
