= Demetrius I Qadi =

Head of the Melkite Greek Catholic Church from 1919 to 1925

- Patriarch of Antioch
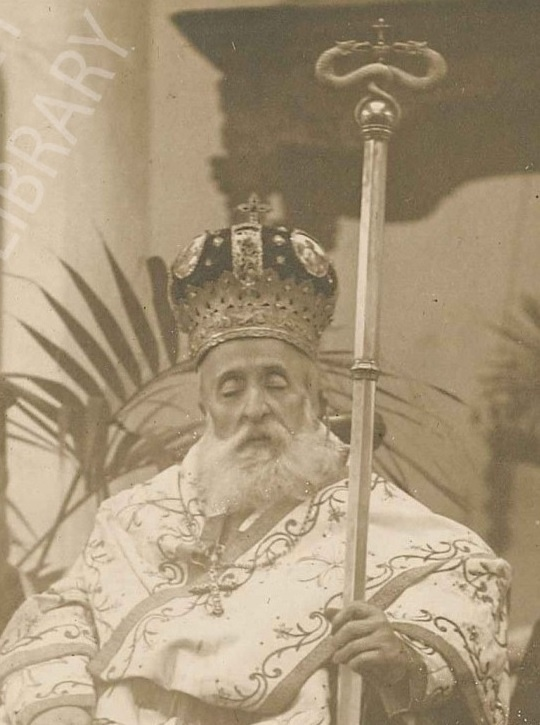
- Church: Melkite Greek Catholic Church
- See: Patriarch of Antioch
- Installed: March 29, 1919
- Term ended: October 25, 1925
- Predecessor: Cyril VIII Jaha
- Successor: Cyril IX Moghabghab

Orders
- Consecration: November 29, 1903 (Bishop) by Cyril VIII Jaha

Personal details
- Born: January 18, 1861 Damascus, Ottoman Syria (modern-day Syria)
- Died: 25 October 1925 (aged 64)

Demetrius I Qadi (or Dimitros I Cadi) (January 18, 1861, Damascus, Syria – October 25, 1925) was Patriarch of Antioch and All the East, and Alexandria and Jerusalem of the Melkite Greek Catholic Church from 1919 until 1925.

== Life ==
Joseph Qadi was born in Damascus, Syria. Ordained a Melkite priest in 1888, Qadi was appointed Patriarchal Vicar of Jerusalem in 1895, resigning in 1898. He was elected eparch of Aleppo on October 27, 1903, and ordained eparch on November 29, 1903, by patriarch Cyril VIII Jaha, being Gaudenzio Bonfigli, O.F.M, titular bishop of Cabasa, and Joseph Dumani, BS, Eparch of Tripoli, his co-consecrators. On March 29, 1919, he was elected patriarch by the Melkite Synod of Bishops, with the Holy See accepting his request for ecclesiastical communion on July 3 of the same year. At that point the patriarchate had been vacant for three years since the death of Cyril VIII Jaha in 1916.

During his brief reign the Melkite Church experienced a rapid expansion in the Near East as situations for the Greek Catholics improved during the period of the French Mandate for Syria and the Lebanon. Demetrius also began radical reforms in the Melkite Church, including preparations for Melkite councils to address canonical matters. However, Demetrius did not live to participate in these councils, and died on October 25, 1925. He was succeeded upon his death by Patriarch Cyril IX Moghabghab.

== Consecrator of Melkite Eparchs ==
During his patriarchate he was consecrator of some Melkite eparchs:

- Maximos IV Sayegh, Archeparch of Tyre
- Etienne Soukkarie, Titular Archbishop of Myra dei Greco-Melkiti and Patriarchal Vicar of Alexandria in Egypt
- Basil Khoury, Archeparch of Homs
- Basil Cattan, Archeparch of Beirut and Byblos
- Anthony Farage, Titular bishop of Laodicea in Syria per i Melchiti and Patriarchal Procurator in Antioch
- Meletius Abou-Assaleh, Eparch of Baalbek in Lebanon
- Joseph Kallas, Eparch of Tripoli in Lebanon

== Distinctions ==
- Order of Saint Lazarus (statuted 1910)

== See also ==
- Melkite Greek Catholic Patriarchate of Antioch and All the East
- Melkite Greek Catholic Church

== Notes ==
Catholic Church titles
Preceded by Cyril VIII	Patriarch of Antioch; 1919–1925	Succeeded by Cyril IX
