= Melkite Greek Catholic Archeparchy of Latakia =

Eastern Catholic archeparchy in Syria

Coordinates: 35.5167°N 35.7833°E

Archeparchy of Latakia (Melkite Greek) Archeparchy Laodicena Graecorum Melkitarum

Location
- Country: Syria

Statistics
- Population: (as of 2013); 14,500
- Parishes: 18

Information
- Denomination: Melkite Greek Catholic Church
- Rite: Byzantine Rite
- Established: 1961
- Cathedral: Our Lady of Annunciation Cathedral

Current leadership
- Pope: Leo XIV
- Patriarch: Youssef Absi
- Archeparch: Georges Khawam, S.M.S.P.
- Bishops emeritus: Nikolaki Sawaf

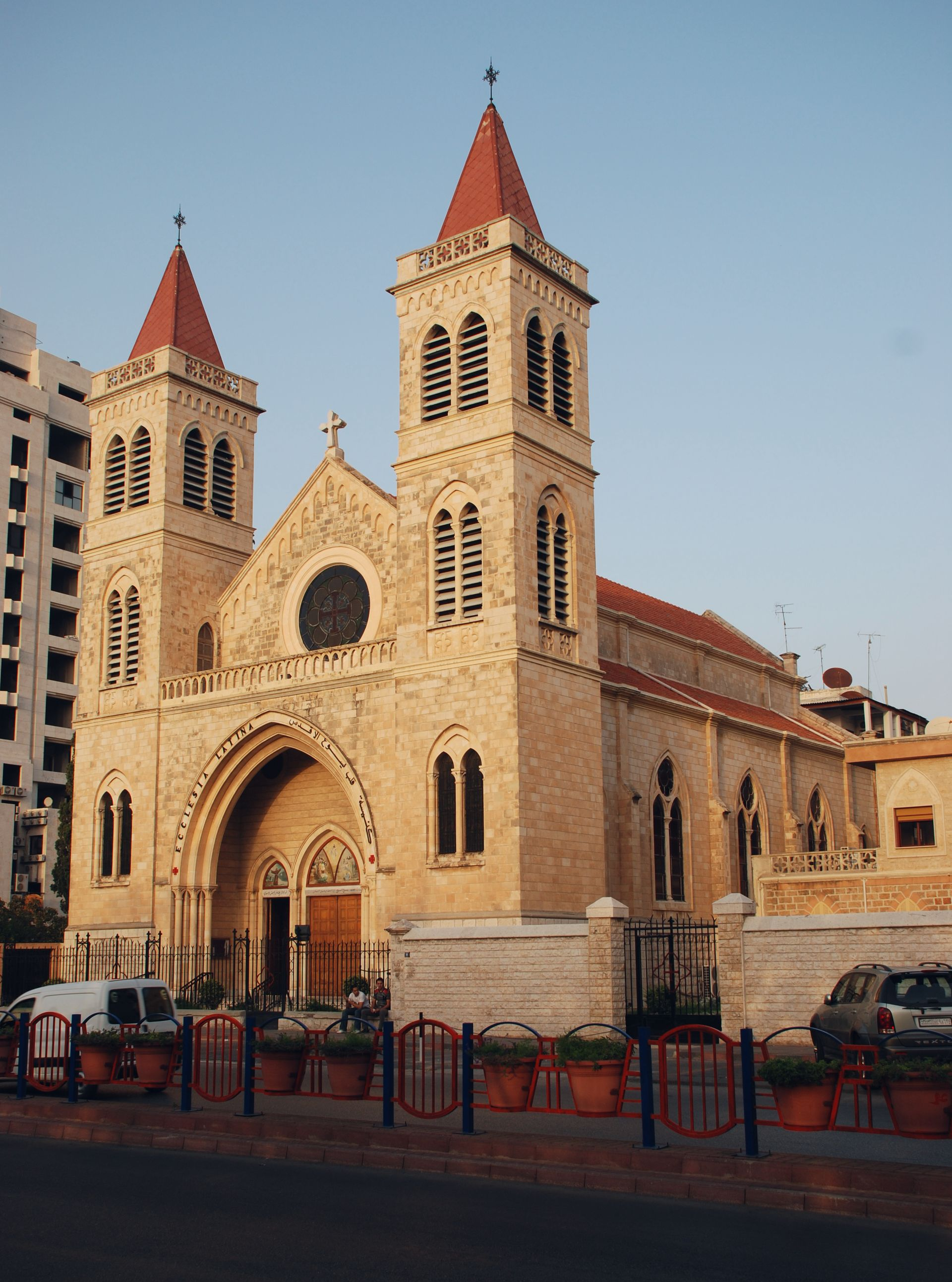
Latin Church, Latakia

Melkite Greek Catholic Archeparchy of Latakia (in Latin: Archeparchy Laodicena Graecorum Melkitarum) is an eparchy of the Melkite Greek Catholic Church immediately subject to the Holy See. In 2009 there were 14,500 baptized. It is currently governed by archeparch Georges Khawam.

== Territory and statistics ==
The archeparchy includes the Syrian governorates of Latakia and Tartus on the coast of the Mediterranean. Its archeparchial seat is the city of Latakia (Laodiceia formerly), where is located the Cathedral of Our Lady of the Annunciation.

The territory is divided into 18 parishes and had 14,500 Catholics in 2013.

== History ==
The archeparchy was erected on April 28, 1961 with the Papal bull Qui Dei consilio of Pope John XXIII, and its territory was taken from Melkite Greek Catholic Archeparchy of Tripoli in Lebanon. With this act, the pope confirmed the decision of the Melkite Synod of restoring an old episcopal see, until 1961 only titular one.

== Titular Bishops ==
- Germanos Mouakkad, BS (March 14, 1886 ordered - February 11, 1912 deceased)
- Antonio Farage (1 January 1922 - March 7, 1961 appointed titular archbishop of the Greek Melkites in Damietta)

=== Bishops ===
- Paul Achkar (September 20, 1961 - August 18, 1981 withdrawn)
- Michel Yatim (August 18, 1981 - July 18, 1995 withdrawn)
- Fares Maakaroun, S.M.S.P. (July 31, 1995 - December 18, 1999 appointed archeparch of Melkite Greek Catholic Eparchy of Nossa Senhora do Paraíso em São Paulo)
- Nikolaki Sawaf (January 14, 2000 - August 17, 2021 withdrawn)
- Georges Khawam, S.M.S.P. (since August 17, 2021)
