= Maximos IV Sayegh =

Head of the Melkite Greek Catholic Church from 1947 to 1967

His Eminent Beatitude Maximos IV Sayegh S.M.S.P.
- Cardinal Patriarch (Melkite Greek) of Antioch
- Native name: مكسيموس الرابع صايغ
- Church: Melkite Greek Catholic Church
- See: Antioch
- Elected: 30 October 1947
- Installed: 21 June 1948
- Term ended: 5 November 1967
- Predecessor: Cyril IX Moghabghab
- Successor: Maximos V Hakim
- Other post: Bishop of Damas
- Previous posts: Archbishop of Tyr (1919–1933); Melkite Greek Catholic Archeparchy of Beirut and Byblos (1933–1947)

Orders
- Ordination: 17 September 1905
- Consecration: 30 August 1919 by Demetrius I Qadi
- Created cardinal: 22 February 1965 by Pope Paul VI
- Rank: Patriarch, Cardinal-Bishop

Personal details
- Born: Massimo Sayegh; 10 April 1878 Aleppo, Aleppo Vilayet, Ottoman Syria
- Died: 5 November 1967 (aged 89) Beirut, Lebanon
- Denomination: Melkite Catholic

Maximos IV Sayegh S.M.S.P. (or Saïgh; Arabic: مكسيموس الرابع صايغ; 10 April 1878 – 5 November 1967) was a Syrian Catholic prelate who served as Patriarch of Antioch and All the East, and Alexandria and Jerusalem in the Melkite Greek Catholic Church from 1947 until his death in 1967. One of the fathers of Second Vatican Council, he stirred attendees by urging reconciliation between the Catholic and Eastern Orthodox churches. He accepted the title of cardinal in 1965 after Pope Paul VI clarified the significance of that title in the case of an Eastern patriarch.

== Life ==
Massimo Sayegh was born on 10 April 1878 in Aleppo. He was ordained a priest on 17 September 1905. On 30 August 1919 he was appointed archbishop of Tyre in Lebanon and consecrated eparch by patriarch Demetrius I Qadi. His co-consecrators were Ignatius Homsi, titular bishop of Tarsus dei Greco-Melchiti and Flavien Khoury, Archeparch of Homs. On 30 August 1933 he was named Archeparch of Beirut and Byblos.

The Synod of Bishops of the Melkite Church elected Maximos Patriarch of Antioch on 30 October 1947, succeeding the recently deceased Cyril IX Moghabghab. His confirmation by the Holy See was on 21 June 1948.

Following an old tradition of the more-than-900-year-old Order of Knighthood, founded in Jerusalem to take care of lepers in the Hospital St. Lazare, he was the Spiritual Protector of the international ecumenical Military and Hospitaller Order of St. Lazarus of Jerusalem.

== Participation in Second Vatican Council ==
Maximos took part in the Second Vatican Council, where he contributed to the debates in French. There he championed the Eastern tradition of Christianity and won a great deal of respect from Eastern Orthodox observers at the council and the approbation of the Ecumenical Patriarch of Constantinople, Athenagoras I.

As a participant in Vatican II, Maximos spoke forcefully against the latinization of the Eastern Catholic churches, and urged a greater receptivity to the eastern Christian traditions, especially in the area of ecclesiology. He stated that

We have, therefore, a twofold mission to accomplish within the Catholic Church. We must fight to ensure that Latinism and Catholicism are not synonymous, that Catholicism remains open to every culture, every spirit, and every form of organization compatible with the unity of faith and love. At the same time, by our example, we must enable the Orthodox Church to recognize that a union with the great Church of the West, with the See of Peter, can be achieved without being compelled to give up Orthodoxy or any of the spiritual treasures of the apostolic and patristic East, which is opened toward the future no less to the past.

Also at Vatican II, Maximos successfully advocated use of vernacular languages for liturgical services, noting that:

Christ offered the first Eucharistic Sacrifice in a language which could be understood by all who heard him, namely, Aramaic. … Never could the idea have come to them [the Apostles] that in a Christian gathering the celebrant should read the texts of Holy Scripture, sing psalms, preach or break bread, and at the same time use a language different from that of the community gathered there … because this language [Latin] was spoken by the faithful of that time, Greek was abandoned in favor of Latin. … Why, then, should the Roman Church cease to apply the same principle today?

Speaking at the Council on the matter of indulgences, he noted that "the practice of indulgences too often favors in the faithful a sort of pious bookkeeping in which one forgets what is essential, namely, the sacred and personal effort of penance".

== Cardinal ==
Maximos IV accepted the title of cardinal in February 1965. Previously he had refused three times the honor on the grounds that "for a patriarch to accept a cardinalate is treason". Maximos IV's objections were rooted in history and ecclesiology: he argued that the patriarchs of the Eastern Churches were heads of their respective churches and successors to their respective apostolic sees only subordinate to the Roman Pontiff but were not subordinate to the cardinals whose position was that of being members of the principal clergy of the diocese of Rome. Maximos also argued that the rank of patriarch being only subordinate to the pope had been repeatedly confirmed by past ecumenical councils and never explicitly revoked by any pope. As such it would be inappropriate for him or other Eastern Catholic patriarchs to accept the rank of cardinal which implied being made a titular member of the Latin Church with a subordinate clerical rank as opposed to their being leaders of their respective churches and successors to their respective apostolic sees united under the leadership of the Supreme Pontiff.

On 11 February 1965, Pope Paul VI decreed (Note: Via the motu propio Ad Purpuratorum Patrum) that Eastern patriarchs who are elevated to the College of Cardinals would belong to the order of cardinal-bishops, ranked after the suburbicarian cardinal-bishops; that they would not be part of the Roman clergy and would not be assigned any Roman suburbicarian diocese, church or deaconry; that their sees as cardinals would be their patriarchal see. (Note: Pope John Paul II confirmed the rule that Eastern Catholic Patriarchs made cardinals would have their patriarchal sees as the sees assigned to them as cardinals in the Code of Canon Law of 1983.) Pope Paul VI's decree satisfied many of the concerns of Maximos and he accepted his elevation to the rank of cardinal. He was created cardinal-bishop patriarch in the consistory of 22 February 1965 and received the red biretta on 25 February 1965.

The patriarch's acceptance was protested by Elias Zoghby, the Patriarchal Vicar for the See of Alexandria, Cairo and the Sudan. The vicar opposed the acceptance of the status of a Roman cardinal by the Melkite patriarch, on the grounds that "the leader of an Eastern Catholic church should not hold a subordinate Latin-rite office" and in protest of Maximos' acceptance Zoghby resigned as vicar. The patriarch gave a speech on 14 March 1965, clarifying his reasons for accepting and how the Pope Paul's decree altered the nature of the College of Cardinals: it was no longer just an institution within the Latin Church but was now the senate of the entire Catholic Church and an Eastern Catholic patriarch who became a cardinal was no longer accepting a subordinate position in the clergy of the Latin church. It was now a way for the pope to extend to the Eastern patriarchs an additional role in helping him govern the universal church.

On 22 November 1965, he was assigned the church of Santa Maria in Cosmedin for religious celebrations while he was in Rome. He was not assigned the Roman deaconry title associated with the church as he would have been were he not an Eastern patriarch. The title of cardinal-deacon of Santa Maria in Cosmedin was retained by Cardinal Francesco Roberti, who held the titular church from 15 December 1958 until 26 June 1967.

== Death ==
In October 1966 he received medical treatment at the Curie Institute (Paris) for a tumor on his left eyelid. His health deteriorated upon his return to Damascus, and on 8 October 1967 Maximos traveled to Beirut for further cancer treatment. He died on 5 November 1967 in Beirut at the age of 89. He was succeeded by Maximos V Hakim.

== See also ==
- Melkite Greek Catholic Patriarchate of Antioch and All the East
- Melkite Greek Catholic Church
- Patriarch of Antioch
- Maximos V Hakim, Patriarch
- Gregory III Laham, late Patriarch

== General references ==
- Dick, Ignatios (2004). Melkites: Greek Orthodox and Greek Catholics of the Patriarchates of Antioch, Alexandria and Jerusalem. Roslindale, MA.: Sophia Press.
- Murphy, Gerasimos (2011). Maximos IV at Vatican II: A Quest for Autonomy. Roslindale, MA.: Sophia Press.
