= Ain Traz =

Seminary in Beirut, Lebanon

Coordinates: 33°44′6″N 35°34′50″E

The Ain Traz Seminary of the Melkite Greek Catholic Church, located southeast of Beirut, Lebanon, has served various roles during its 200-year history.

== History ==
The village of Ain Traz was home to the Maronite Saad clan, members of whom where French Consuls in Beirut during the mid-eighteenth century. The seminary was founded in 1811 by Melkite Patriarch Agapius II Matar. After having been looted by the Druze in 1841 and in 1845, it was re-opened in 1870.

After the foundation of the Melkite Seminary of St. Anne at Jerusalem, Ain Traz was no longer used as a seminary. Instead, it was then used for late vocations and for married men preparing for the priesthood. It also served as a monastery and as summer residence for the Melkite patriarch. Starting in 1948 it was also used by Patriarch Maximos IV for the annual meetings of the Melkite Synod of Bishops. became yearly events. Throughout its history the facility hosted several important Melkite councils, such as the legislative synod convened in 1909 by Patriarch Cyril VIII Jaha.

In 1983, during the violence following the Lebanese Civil War, Ain Traz was looted and burned, resulting in the loss of much of the patriarchal library and archives. The new patriarchal summer residence in Rabweh, completed in 1977, replaced Ain Traz. However, Ain Traz has been restored and is once again used for synods.

== Bibliography ==
- Descy, Serge (1993). The Melkite Church. Boston: Sophia Press.
- King, Archdale (2007). The Rites of Eastern Christendom. Boston: Gorgias Press LLC. ISBN 978-1-59333-392-8.
- "The Patriarchal See of Antioch - Damascus". Global Melkite Association. Archived from the original on 28 August 2008.
