= Catholic Church in Jordan =

The Catholic Church in Jordan is part of the worldwide Catholic Church, under the spiritual leadership of the Pope in Rome.

In 2023, Christians made up 2.1% of Jordan's population. Of these half, or 1.06% of the country's population were Catholics (115,000 people).

Catholics are divided in five Rites:

- 80,000 Latin Catholics (Patriarchal Vicariate for Jordan of the Latin Patriarch of Jerusalem)
- 32,000 Melkite Catholics (Melkite Greek Catholic Archeparchy of Petra and Philadelphia in Amman)
- 1,500 Syrian Catholics (Syriac Catholic Patriarchal Exarchate of Jerusalem covers also Jordan)
- 1,000 Maronite Catholics (Maronite Catholic Patriarchal Exarchate of Jordan)
- 500 Armenian Catholics (Armenian Catholic Patriarchal Exarchate of Jerusalem and Amman covers also Jordan)

There are also thousands of Chaldean Catholic (Chaldean Catholic Territory Dependent on the Patriarch of Jordan) refugees from Iraq.

The whole of the country for all Melkites forms a single Archeparchy. Jordanian Catholics belonging to the Greek Catholic churches use the Melkite Rite, these are referred to as "Roum Catholiks" in Jordan (Roum or Rome referring to Byzantine, while those following the standard rites of the Catholic Church are referred to as "Lateen" and belong to the Latin Patriarch of Jerusalem).

An important Catholic charity in Jordan is Caritas Jordan.

== Parishes ==
There are 32 Latin Catholic parishes in Jordan in 2023. Melkite Greek Catholic Church has 28 parishes, Syrian Catholics have 3 parishes, Maronite Catholics have 2 parishes and Armenian Catholics have 1 parish. There are 66 Catholic parishes in all Jordan, belonging to five Catholic traditions.

== Papal visits ==
There have been 4 papal visits so far to Jordan:

Pope Paul VI visited Jordan in 1964, as part of the first papal pilgrimage to the Holy Land.

Pope John Paul II visited Jordan in 2000.

Pope Benedict XVI visited Jordan in 2009.

Pope Francis visited Jordan in 2014.

== See also ==
- Religion in Jordan
- Christianity in Jordan
- Eastern Orthodoxy in Jordan
- Freedom of religion in Jordan
- St. Joseph's Church
- Church of the Redeemer
