= Orthodox Christianity in Jordan =

The term Orthodox Christianity in Jordan may refer to:

- Eastern Orthodox Christianity in Jordan, representing communities and institutions of Eastern Orthodox Church, in Jordan
- Oriental Orthodox Christianity in Jordan, representing communities and institutions of Oriental Orthodox Church, in Jordan

== See also ==
- Orthodox Christianity (disambiguation)
- Jordan
