= Christianity in Jordan =

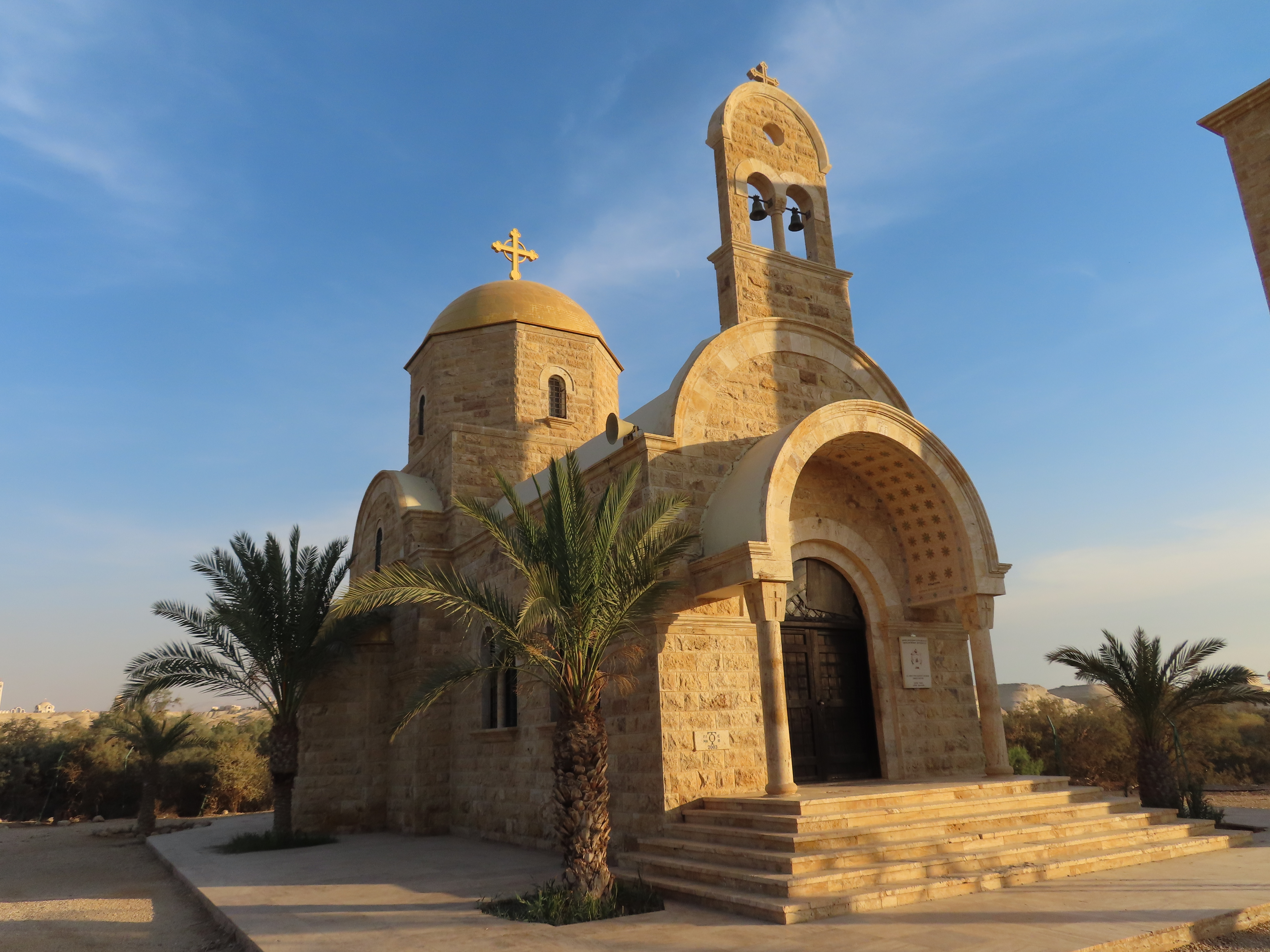
The Greek Orthodox Church of St. John the Baptist at Al-Maghtas, Jordan.

Jordan is home to one of the oldest Christian communities in the world, dating back to the crucifixion of Jesus Christ early in the 1st century AD. The region of Transjordan became an important centre of Christianity during the Byzantine period, and Christian communities continued to live there following the Muslim conquest of the Levant in the seventh century AD. Many Christian Jordanians trace their ancestry to the indigenous Christian populations of the Levant, including Arab tribes associated with the Ghassanids.

Christian Jordanians constitute a religious minority (around 3% or 250,000-400,000) in the predominantly Muslim country and belong to several denominations, the largest of which is the Greek Orthodox Church. Other major communities include Latin and Melkite Greek Catholics, Protestants, and Armenian and Syriac Orthodox Christians. Christian Jordanians have historically contributed to the country's political, economic and cultural development, particularly in education, healthcare, commerce and public service.

Christian Jordanians participate in the country's political and public life, enjoying a high level of freedom. All Christian religious ceremonies are publicly celebrated in Jordan. The Jordanian constitution provides for religious freedom, although conversion from Islam and evangelism among Muslims face legal and social restrictions. Christian communities maintain their own churches and ecclesiastical courts for matters of personal status, while Christian schools, hospitals and charitable institutions serve people from different religious backgrounds. The Jordanian monarchy has also supported the preservation of Christian holy sites and the country's religious heritage.

== History ==
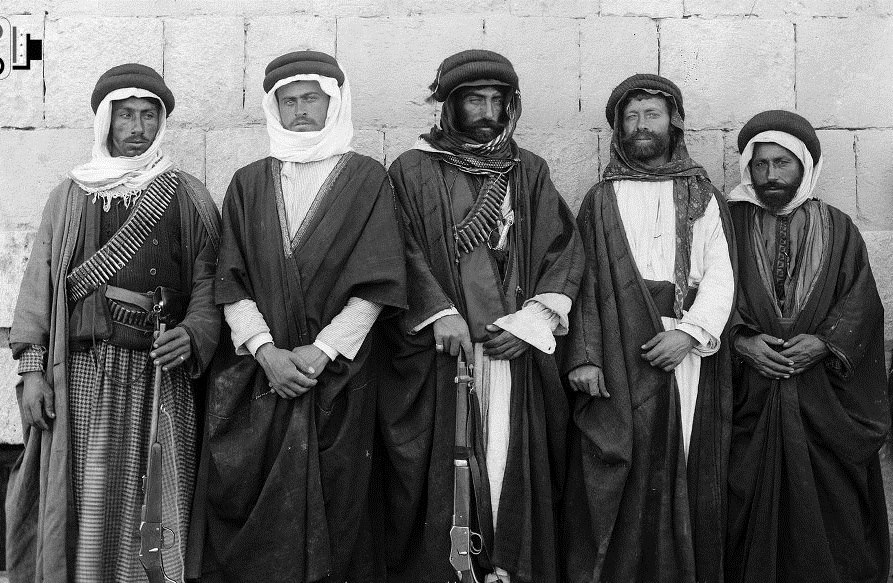
A small percentage of Jordanian Christians are Bedouin, the picture shows a Bedouin Christian family from Madaba in 1904

The history of Christianity in present-day Jordan dates back to the Apostolic Age, when the region formed part of the Roman province of Arabia Petraea and the wider Holy Land. Archaeological and literary evidence indicates that the region became an important center of Christianity during the Byzantine period and remained home to substantial Christian communities after the Muslim conquest of the Levant.

Many Jordanian Christians trace their ancestry to the indigenous Christian populations of the Levant, including Arab tribes such as the Ghassanids, who served as federates of the Byzantine Empire and played a major role in the religious and political life of the region.

The majority of Jordanian Christians belong to the Eastern Orthodox Church under the jurisdiction of the Greek Orthodox Patriarchate of Jerusalem, one of the oldest Christian sees in the world.

During the Battle of Mu'tah in 629 CE, fought near present-day Al-Karak, Muslim forces confronted troops of the Byzantine Empire and their Arab Christian allies, including contingents associated with the Ghassanids.

Following the Muslim conquest of the Levant in the seventh century, Christian communities continued to live throughout the region and remained an important component of its social and religious landscape.

From 1916 to 1918, during the Arab Revolt, Arab forces in the region that later became Jordan participated alongside other Arab groups in the uprising against the Ottoman Empire. Following the collapse of Ottoman rule after World War I, the territory of Transjordan came under British administration as part of the British Mandate period and the Emirate of Transjordan, which later became the independent Hashemite Kingdom of Jordan. During the 1948 Arab–Israeli War and the Six-Day War of 1967, the Jordanian Armed Forces included both Muslim and Christian citizens, who served together in defense of Jordan and participated in the broader Arab–Israeli conflicts. Jordanian Christians have also played an active role in the social, political, and economic development of the modern Jordanian state, contributing significantly to public service, education, healthcare, commerce, and other sectors.

Christians today make up about 3% of the population. There are approximately 250,000-400,000 Jordanian Christians in a country of almost 10 million. Their total share of the population was 20% in 1930, and their absolute numbers have increased since then. This is the result of high immigration rate of Muslims into Jordan, high emigration rates of Christians, and high birth rates for Muslims.

On 23 October 2026, islamists killed 9 people and injured 40 others during a funeral at a Greek Orthodox church in the village of Hammoud, in Karak governorate.

== Role in Jordanian society ==
Christians are exceptionally well integrated in the Jordanian society and have a comparatively high level of freedom, though they are not free to evangelize Muslims. They form a significant part of the kingdom's political and economic elite. Christians enjoy high economic and social opportunities in the Hashemite Kingdom of Jordan compared to the position of some, but not all, of their co-religionists in the rest of the Middle East. Christians are allotted 9 out of 130 seats in the Jordanian parliament and also hold important ministerial portfolios, ambassadorial appointments, and positions of high military rank.

Jordanian Christians are allowed by the public and private sectors to leave their work to attend mass on Sundays. All Christian religious ceremonies are publicly celebrated in Jordan. Christians have established good relations with the royal family and the various Jordanian government officials, and they have their own ecclesiastical courts for matters of personal status. The government has contributed to restoring pilgrimages to the baptismal site of Jesus. Christians involved in Jordanian politics include Deputy Prime Minister Rajai Muasher and ambassador to the U.S. Dina Kawar.

Jordanian Christians of the evangelical church created the Jordan Evangelical Council in 2006. The most recent elections in September 2019 elected Reverend Habes Nimat as president and Reverend David Rihani as vice president.

King Abdullah II is an ardent supporter of Arab Christians. In 2022, he unveiled plans for the celebrations of the bimillenary of the baptism of Jesus in 2030.

== Demographics ==
In 2022 Muslims made up about 97.2% of the country's population, while Christians made up 2.1% of the country's population. Half of the Christians, or 1.06% of the country's population, were Catholics (115,000 people). A 2015 study estimated 6,500 Christian believers, from a Muslim background, were in the country (mainly Protestant). Jordanian Christians number around 250,000, most of whom are ethnically Arab, according to a 2014 estimate by the Eastern Orthodox Church. The study excluded minority Christian groups and the thousands of Iraqi and Syrian Christians residing in Jordan.

Under sharia law converts from Islam are still considered Muslims; however, there are cases in which a Muslim will adopt the Christian faith, secretly declaring their faith. In effect, they are practising Christians but legally Muslims; thus, the statistics of Jordanian Christians does not include Muslim converts to Christianity. A 2015 study estimates there are some 6,500 Christians from a Muslim background in Jordan.

== Denominations ==
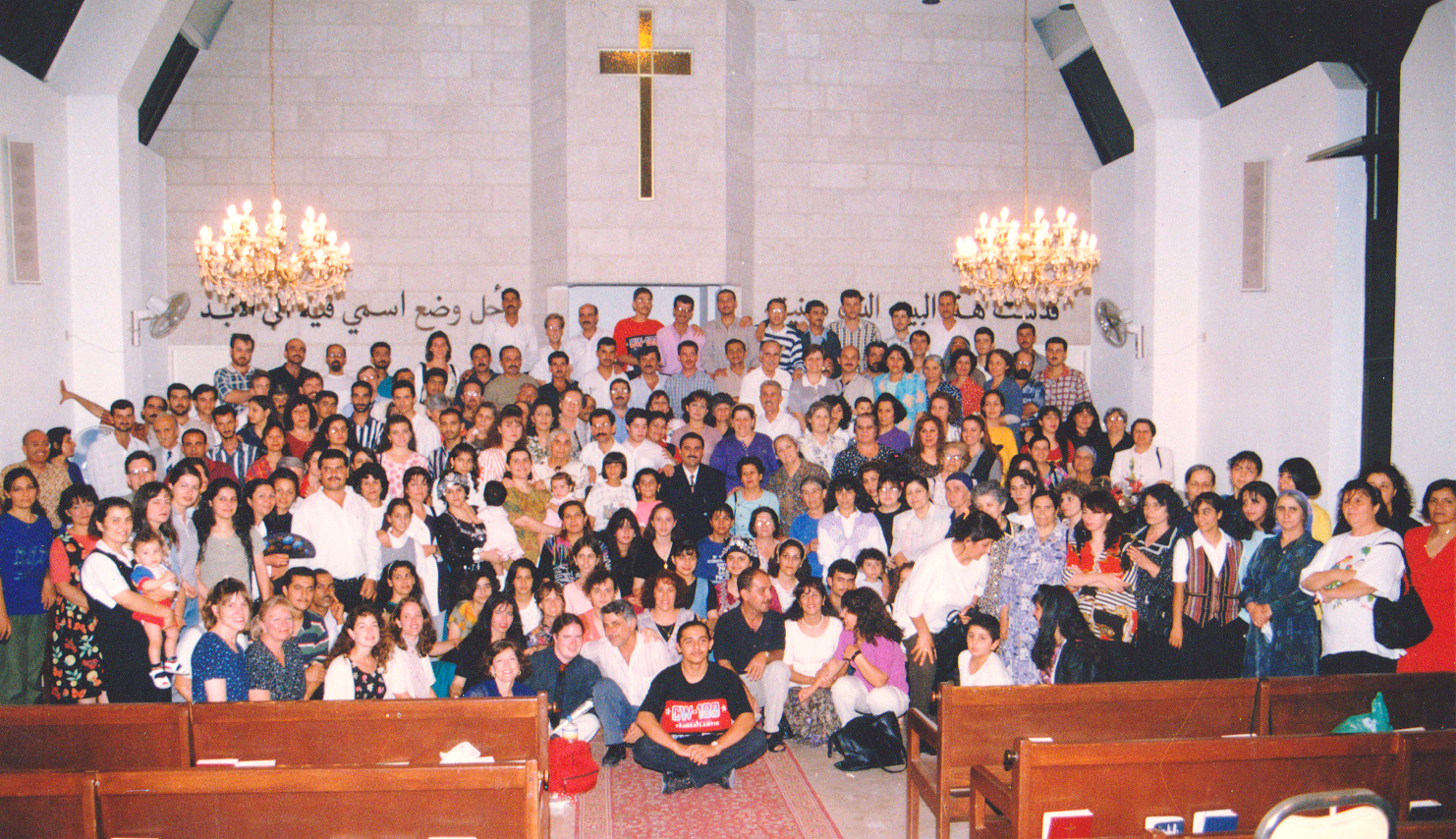
Group of Iraqi Christians (Assyrians) in an evangelical alliance church, Jabal Amman, 1998.

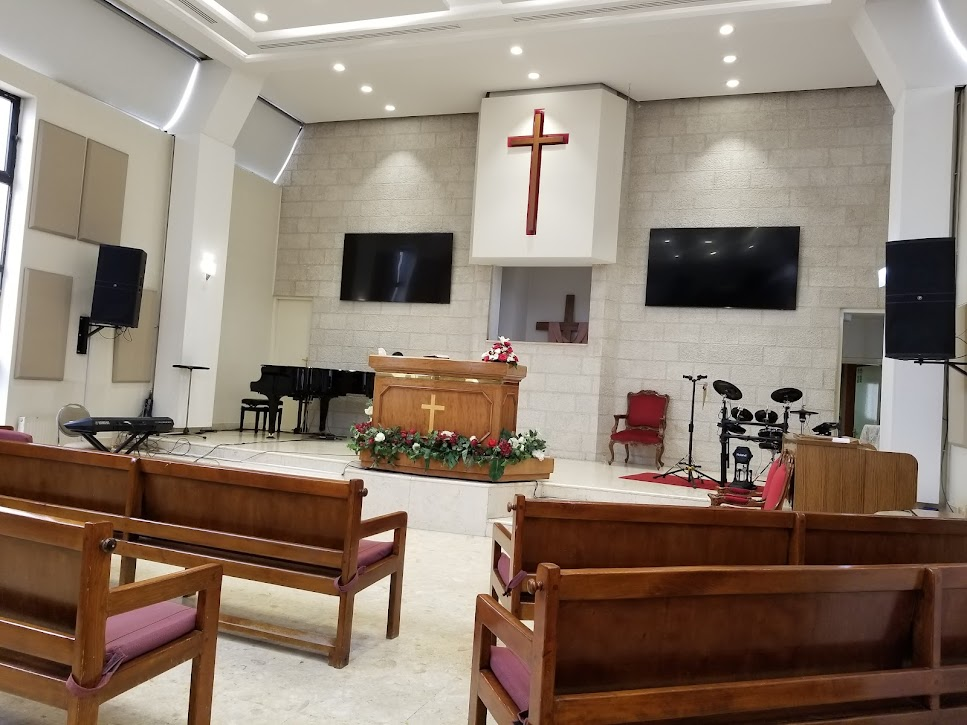
Ittihad Uniting Church, Jabal Amman.

Among the recognized denominations the Greek Orthodox, Catholic (Latin, Melkite Greek Catholic, and Maronite Catholic), Anglican, Armenian Orthodox, and Syriac Orthodox Church make up the majority of Jordan's Christian population. Also the Lutheran, Coptic Orthodox, Seventh-day Adventist, United Pentecostal, Latter-day Saints, and Presbyterian churches are recognized denominations while they make up a much smaller proportion of the Christian population.

In addition to the recognized denominations there are religious societies that are allowed to meet freely, but are not recognized as churches by the government. The recognized religious societies are the Evangelical Free Church, the Church of the Nazarene, the Assembly of God, the Baptist Church, and the Christian and Missionary Alliance.

Christian denominations in Jordan belong to four major denominational groups:

- Protestantism:
  - Evangelical
  - Anglican Bishop in Jerusalem
  - Lutheran
  - Seventh-day Adventist
  - United Pentecostal
  - Presbyterian
- Eastern Orthodox
  - Greek Orthodox Patriarchate of Jerusalem
- Oriental Orthodox:
  - Armenian Patriarchate of Jerusalem
  - Syriac Orthodox Church
  - Coptic Orthodox Church
- Catholic:
  - Latin Patriarchate of Jerusalem
  - Melkite Catholic Archeparchy of Petra
  - Syriac Catholic Patriarchal Exarchate of Jerusalem
  - Armenian Catholic Church
  - Maronite Church

== Sites ==
=== Biblical sites ===
Jordan is part of the Holy Land and has several biblical attractions that attract pilgrimage and tourist activities. Biblical sites include; Al-Maghtas where Jesus was baptized; Mount Nebo where Moses looked on to the Promised Land; Umm ar-Rasas, a fortified Roman garrison that contains 16 Byzantine churches; Madaba that holds the Madaba Map which is the oldest mosaic map of the Holy Land; Machaerus which is a fortified hilltop overlooking the Dead Sea where John the Baptist was imprisoned and executed; and Umm Qais (Gadara) where Jesus expelled demons out of a man near the shores of the Sea of Galilee.

In northern Jordan, there is a small creek where an angel met and wrestled with the patriarch Jacob. The rock struck by Moses to bring forth water and the patriarch Aaron's tomb are both in southern Jordan. The ruins of the fortress of the Ammonites are on a mountain overlooking downtown Amman. This is the site where King David had Bathsheba's husband Uriah the Hittite killed.

=== Other sites ===
There are many Arab and Frankish castles from the period of the Crusades in Jordan, the most famous of which is Ajlun castle located in the Ajloun district in northern Jordan. Other castles include Montreal and Kerak. Fuheis and Al Husn are two predominantly Christian towns of Jordan. The world's oldest known purpose-built church exists in Aqaba.

== Institutions ==
=== Schools ===
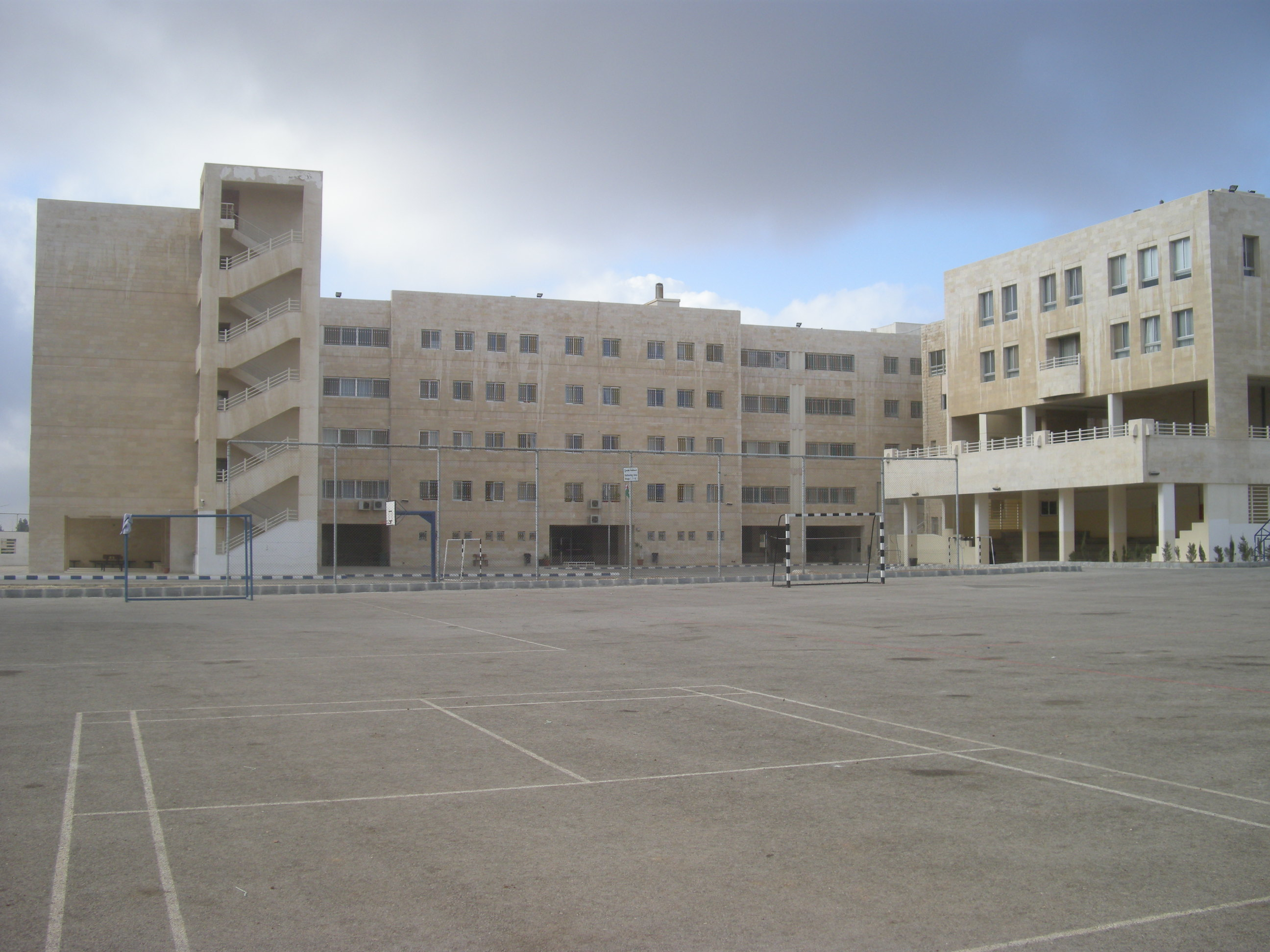
The National Orthodox School in Amman

There are many Christian schools in Jordan that educate students from both Christian and Muslim families. Some members of the royal family have attended a Christian school for a portion of their education. The Rosary Sister's School is run by the Catholic Church. The Franciscan Sisters School is run by the Franciscans. The National Orthodox School is run by the Eastern Orthodox Church and has received The Cambridge Queen Rania Award multiple times.

The Ahliyyah School for Girls, the Bishop's School for Boys, and the Schneller School are run by the Anglican Church in Amman. There are also a school for the blind, a school for the deaf, and a school for physically handicapped students run by the Anglican church. The Baptist School of Amman is administered by the Baptist church in Jordan and enrolls students of both genders. The Baptist School band has played at many official government occasions.

La Salle Amman is one of the most prestigious schools in Amman, founded in 1950. It is an institute of the Brothers of the Christian Schools founded by Jean-Baptiste de la Salle, along with Our Lady of Nazareth College and Terra Santa College. The Alliance Academy of Jordan, a newly founded school in 2014 by the oldest Evangelical community in Jordan, the Church & Missionary Alliance, is regarded as a state of the art British and American-based system school. The latest Chairman of the Board was Vice President of the CMA, Rev. Hassan Dababneh.

=== Hospitals ===
The first hospital built in Jordan was the Evangelical Hospital, built in As-Salt by the Church Missionary Society. The Italian Hospital in Amman and in Kerak were started by a Catholic surgeon and are entrusted to the Comboni Missionary Sisters. The Catholic Church runs a maternity hospital and a general hospital in Irbid. The Government Hospital in Ajloun was originally run by Baptists.

The Annoor Sanatorium in Mafraq, which treats tuberculosis and other lung diseases, was founded by a Christian doctor. Several mission clinics were founded across Jordan.

== Gallery ==
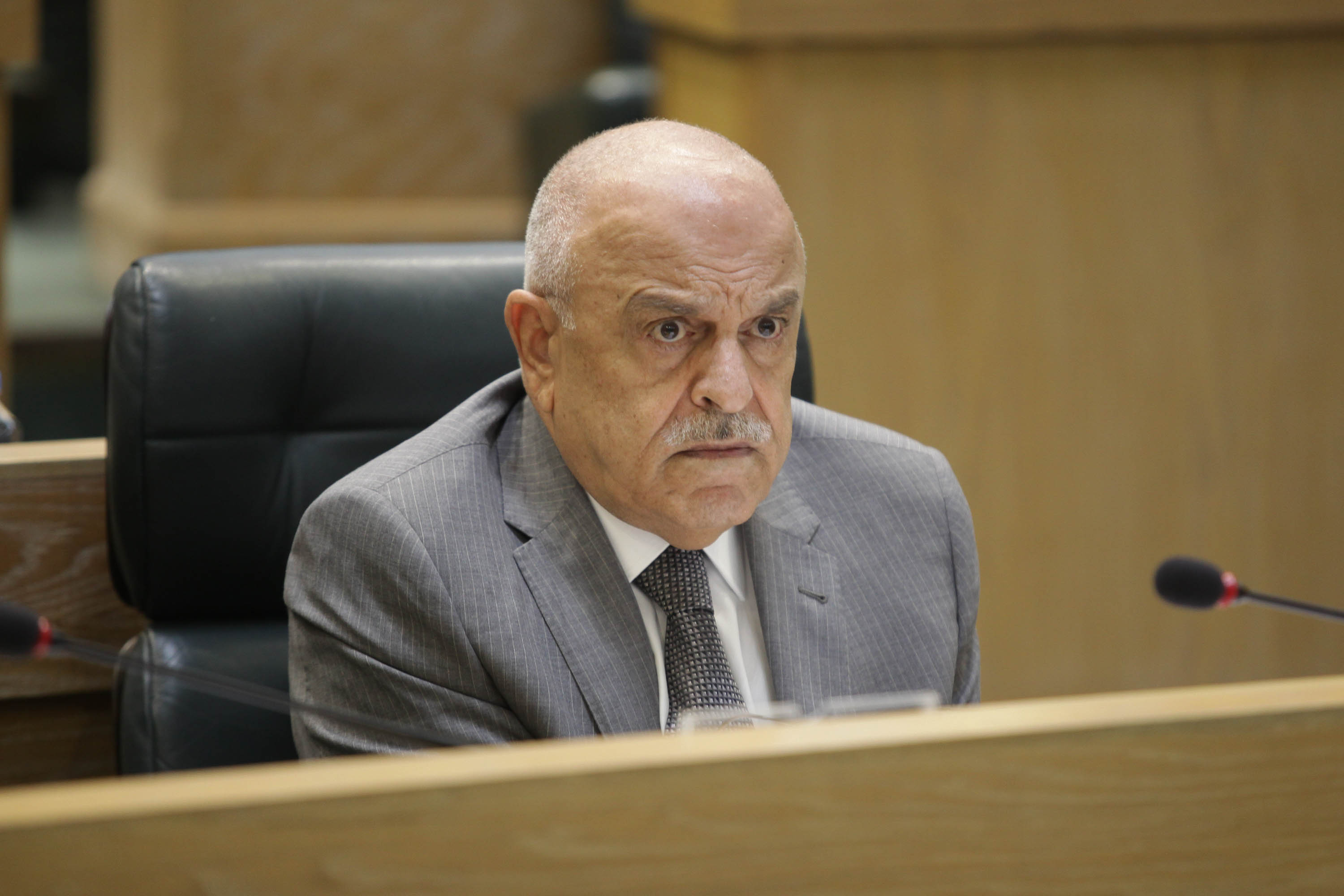
Rajai Muasher served as Deputy Prime Minister

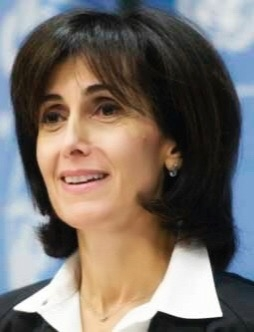
Dina Kawar currently serves as Jordan's Ambassador to the United States

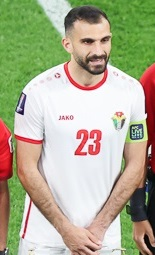
Ihsan Haddad is the current captain of the Jordanian national football team

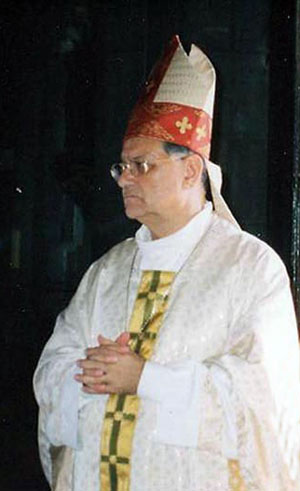
Archbishop Fouad Twal is the Roman Catholic archbishop and Latin Patriarch of Jerusalem from 2008 to 2016.

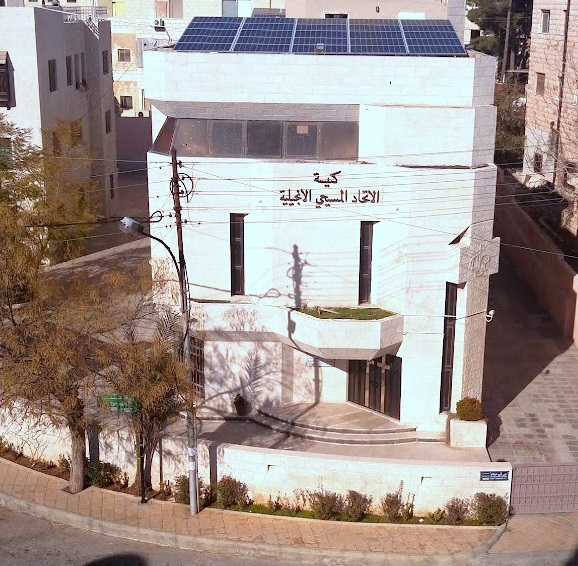
Ittihad Church, an evangelical alliance and Missionary Church in Jabal Amman

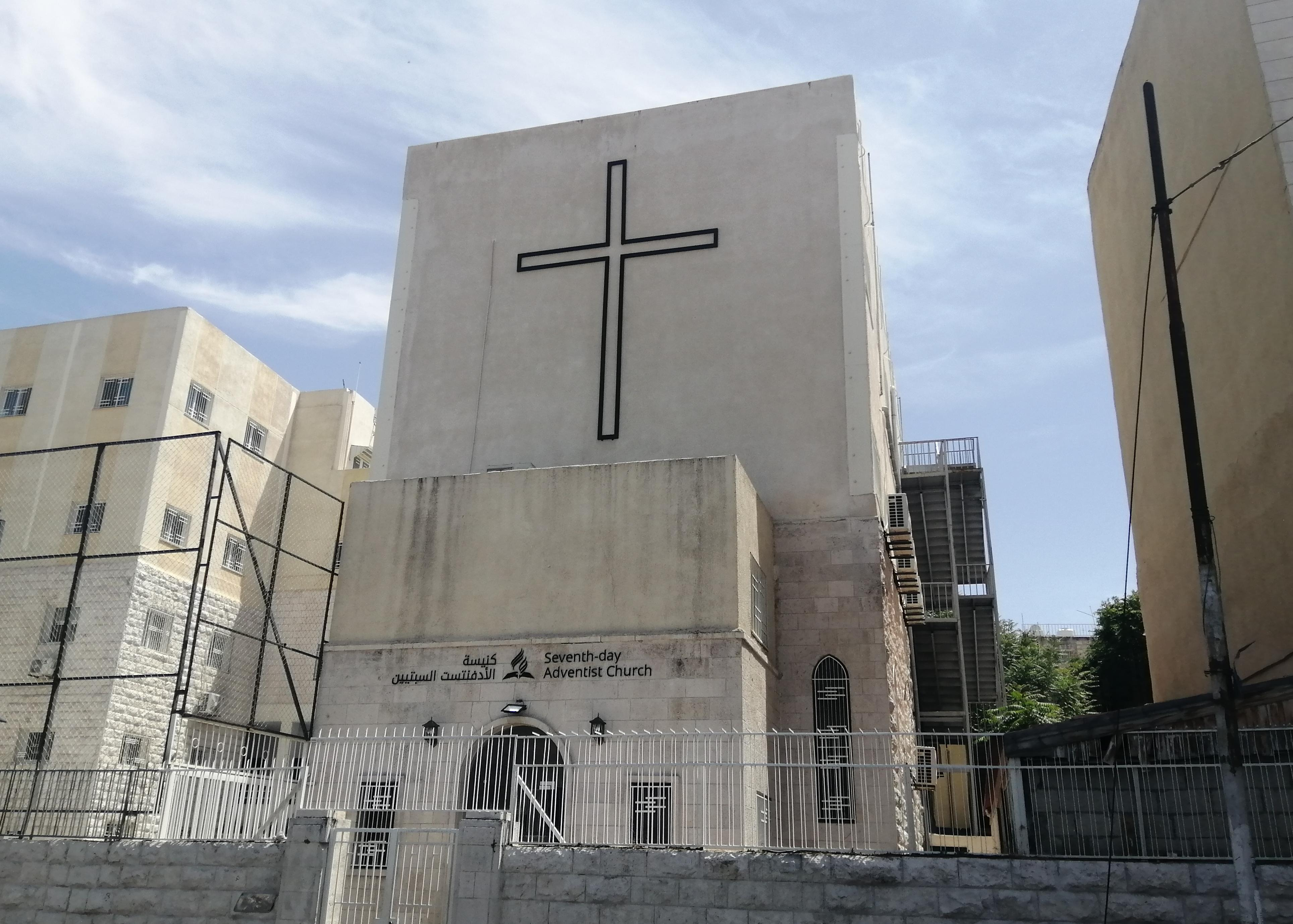
Seventh-day Adventist Church on Rainbow Street

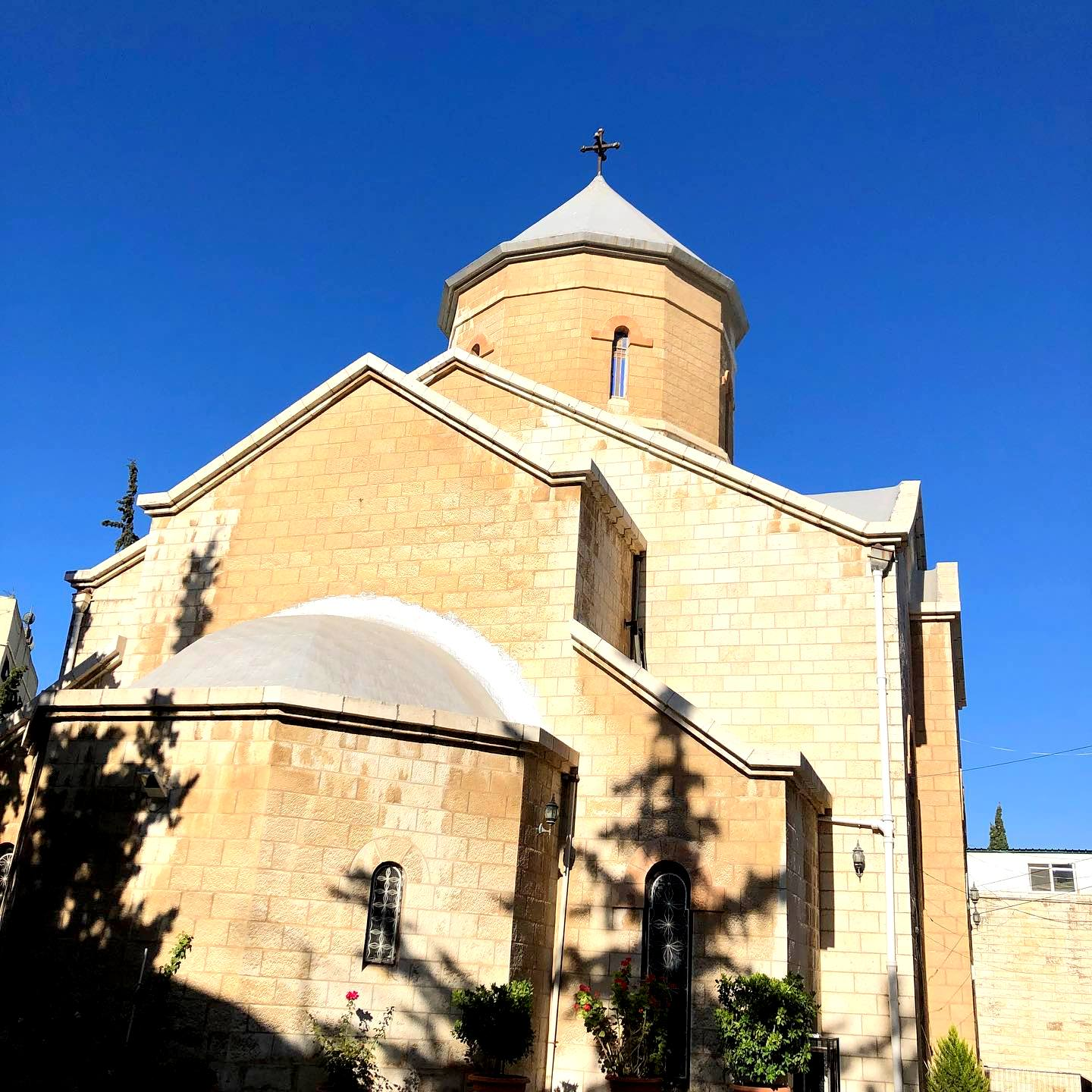
Armenian Apostolic Church, in al-Ashrafiya, Amman

== See also ==
- Arab Christians
- Religion in Jordan
- Minorities in Jordan
- Freedom of religion in Jordan
- Eastern Orthodoxy in Jordan
- Catholic Church in Jordan
- Jordanian Interfaith Coexistence Research Center
- Armenians in Jordan
- List of Byzantine churches in Amman
