= Religion in Jordan =

Religion in Jordan (2021)
1. Islam (97.1%)
2. Christianity (2.10%)
3. Other religions (0.80%)

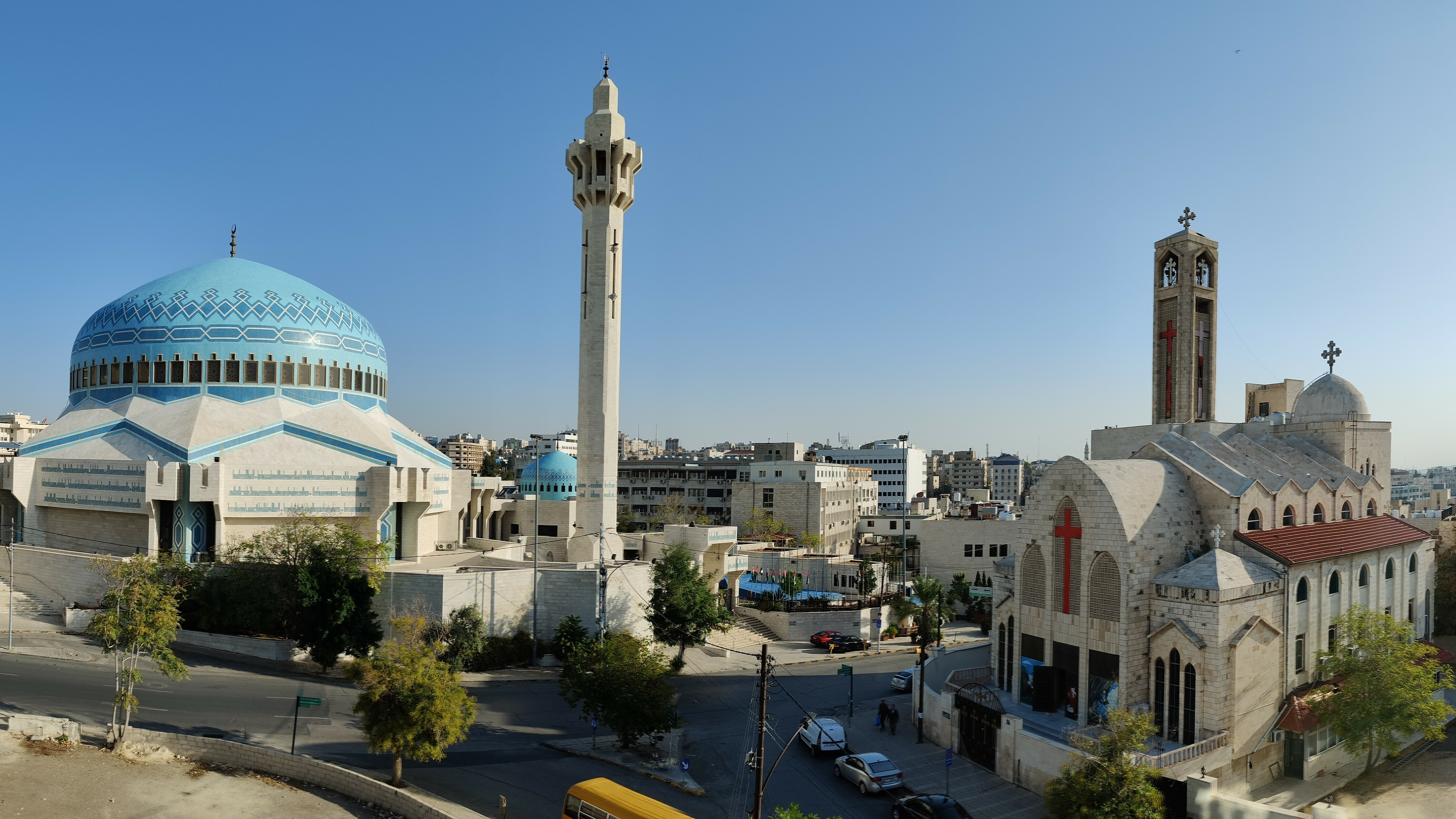
King Abdullah I Mosque and Virgin Mary Coptic Orthodox Church in capital Amman. The royal family of Jordan, the Hashemites, adheres to Sunni branch of Islam.

Sunni Islam is the dominant religion in Jordan. Muslims make up about 97.2% of the country's population. A few of them are Shiites. Many Shia in Jordan are refugees from Syria, Lebanon, and Iraq.

The country also boasts one of the oldest Christian communities in the world, coexisting with the rest of the population. They made up about 4.2% of the population when the country had 5 million inhabitants in 2005. down from 20% in the 1930s, due to several reasons, mainly due to high rates of Muslim immigration into the country. More than half are Eastern Orthodox. The rest are Latin or Greek Rite Catholics, Syrian Orthodox, and Protestants. Jordanian Christians in a country of almost 10 million are thought to number 239,003 individuals including those of Palestinian origin, Syrian and Iraqi Christians in the country.

== Demographics ==
In 2022 Muslims made up about 97.2% of the country's population; there were almost 750,000 refugees and other displaced persons registered in the country, mainly Sunni Muslims from Syria.

In the same year, Christians made up 2.1% of the country's population.

In 2020, there were approximately 14,000 Druze in the country, and 1,000 people following the Baháʼí Faith; there were reported to be no Jewish citizens.

In 2022, it was noted that the country has a small number of Buddhists, Hindus, Zoroastrians and Yazidis.

== Distribution ==
The percentages vary slightly in different cities and regions, for instance the south of Jordan and cities like Zarqa have the highest percentage of Muslims, while Amman, Irbid, Madaba, Salt, and Karak have larger Christian communities than the national average, and the towns of Fuheis, Al Husn, As-Simakiyah and Ajloun have either majority Christian or much greater than national average. Several villages have mixed Christian/Muslim populations, like Kufranja and Raimoun in the north.

Anglicans/Episcopalians in Jordan are under the oversight of the Anglican Bishop in Jerusalem. The Church of the Redeemer is the largest congregation by membership of any church in the entire Episcopal Diocese of Jerusalem. Other Episcopal churches are in Ashrafiyya, Salt, Zarqa, Marka refugee camp, Irbid, Al Husn and Aqaba.

== Social life ==
In general, Muslims and Christians live together with no major problems regarding differences and discrimination. However, the smallest minorities, consisting of small Druze and Baháʼí Faith contingents, experience some degree of religious discrimination from the government.

== Religious freedom ==
The state religion is Islam, but the constitution provides for the freedom to practise one's religion in accordance with the customs that are observed in the Kingdom, unless they violate public order or morality.

Some issues, however, such as religious conversion, are controversial. Although conversion to Islam is relatively free of legal complications, those wishing to leave Islam are not recognised as such and are still considered legally Muslims and face immense societal pressure. Among the restrictions against religious minorities are:

- Jordan's government may deny recognition to a religion.
- Baháʼís are not permitted to establish schools, places of worship or cemeteries.
- Aside from Christians, all other non-Muslim minorities do not have their own courts to adjudicate personal status and family matters.
- Muslim women may not marry non-Muslim men, such as Christians, unless the men legally convert to Islam.
- Since Muslims are prohibited from converting to other religions according to the Sharia law, converts from Islam cannot change their religion on governmental records. However, converts to Islam are required to change their religious identification to "Muslim" on governmental records and civil documents.

In June 2006, the government published the International Covenant on Civil and Political Rights in the government's Official Gazette. Article 18 of that Covenant provides freedom of religion.

In 2023, the country was scored 2 out of 4 for religious freedom.

Baháʼís and other unrecognised religious minorities face several restrictions.

== See also ==
- Demographics of Jordan
- Minorities in Jordan
- Jordanian Interfaith Coexistence Research Center
- Islam in Jordan
- Christianity in Jordan
- History of the Jews in Jordan
- Irreligion in Jordan
