= St. George's Cathedral, Amman =

Coordinates: 31.9732°N 35.8498°E

St. George's Cathedral
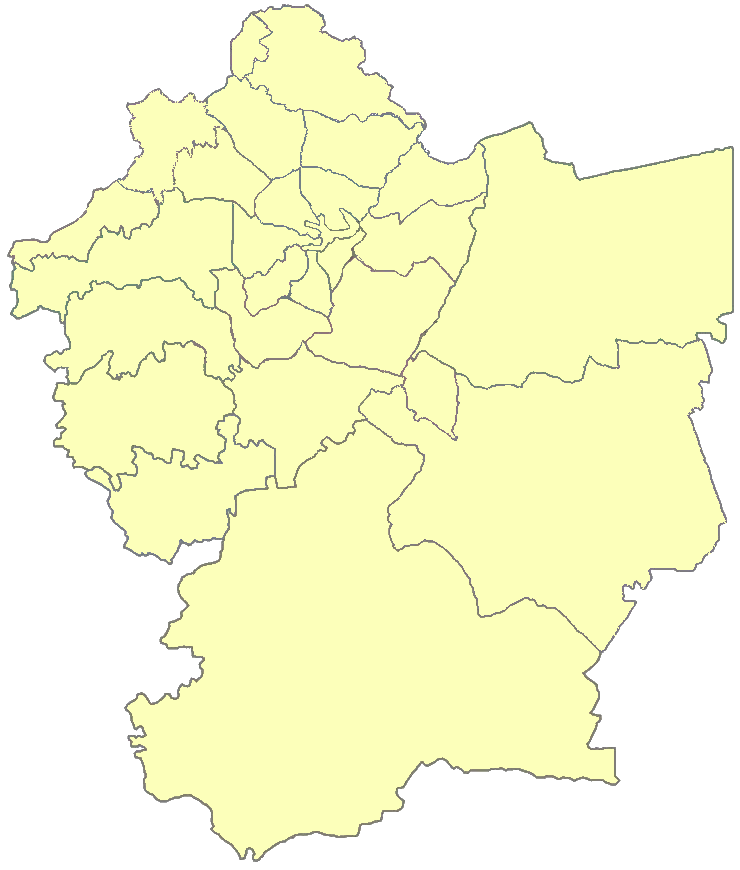
- Location within Amman Location within Jordan
- Location: Amman
- Country: Jordan
- Denomination: Catholic (Melkite Greek)

The St. George's Cathedral or also Greek-Melkite Cathedral of St. George is the Melkite Catholic cathedral, located on the street Mansour, the city of Amman, the capital of the Kingdom of Jordan.

It serves as the headquarters of Melkite Greek Catholic Archeparchy of Petra and Philadelphia in Amman (Archieparchia Petrensis et Philadelphiensis) that was created on May 2, 1932, as Archeparchy of Transjordan with the Bull Apostolica Sedes of Pope Pius XI.

Pope Benedict XVI visited on May 9, 2009.

== See also ==
- Roman Catholicism in Jordan
- Melkite Greek Catholic Church
