= Nabil Haddad =

Nabil Haddad is a priest in the Melkite Greek Catholic Church and a leading figure among Arab Christians in Jordan. He is the founder and current director of the Jordanian Interfaith Coexistence Research Center (JICRC) in Amman, Jordan.

== Biography ==
Nabil Haddad was born in a town near Irbid, Jordan.

For years, Father Nabil Haddad has worked to promote interfaith harmony between Muslims and Christians in Jordan and around the world.

Father Nabil Haddad has worked to implement the ideas behind World Interfaith Harmony Week, first proposed by King Abdullah II of Jordan in an address to the General Assembly of the United Nations on September 23, 2010.

== See also ==
- Jordanian Interfaith Coexistence Research Center
- Amman Message
- Arab Christians
