= Chaldean Catholic Territory Dependent on the Patriarch of Jordan =

The Chaldean Catholic Territory Dependent (or Patriarchal Dependency) on the Patriarch of Jordan is a missionary pre-diocesan jurisdiction of the Chaldean Catholic Church sui iuris (Eastern Catholic : Chaldean Rite, Syriac language) covering (Trans)Jordan.

== See also ==
- Catholic Church in Jordan
- Chaldean Catholic Church
