= Paul Salman =

- Archeparch of Petra and Philadelphia in Amman
- Native name: بول سلمان
- Church: Melkite Greek Catholic Church
- Archdiocese: Melkite Greek Catholic Archeparchy of Petra and Philadelphia in Amman
- In office: 5 June 1932 – 1 July 1948
- Predecessor: Archeparchy erected
- Successor: Mikhayl Assaf

Orders
- Ordination: 20 July 1911
- Consecration: 5 June 1932 by Cyril IX Moghabghab

Personal details
- Born: 25 January 1886 Damascus, Syria vilayet, Ottoman Empire
- Died: 1 July 1948 (aged 62)

Paul Salman (born 25 January 1886 in Damascus, Syria - died on 1 July 1948) was the first Archbishop of the Melkite Greek Catholic Church who, on May 2, 1932 by Pope Pius XI became the archeparch Melkite Greek Catholic Archeparchy of Petra and Philadelphia in Amman.

== Life ==
Salman was ordained on July 20, 1911. His appointment as Archbishop he received at the founding of the Archeparchy on 5 June 1932, then he became a consecrated bishop. After the official confirmation on 13 May 1933, he provided his archbishop's service until his death on July 1, 1948. Salman was succeeded by Mikhayl Assaf.
