= St. Joseph's Church, Amman =

Coordinates: 31.9514°N 35.8708°E

St. Joseph's Church
- كنيسة القديس يوسف
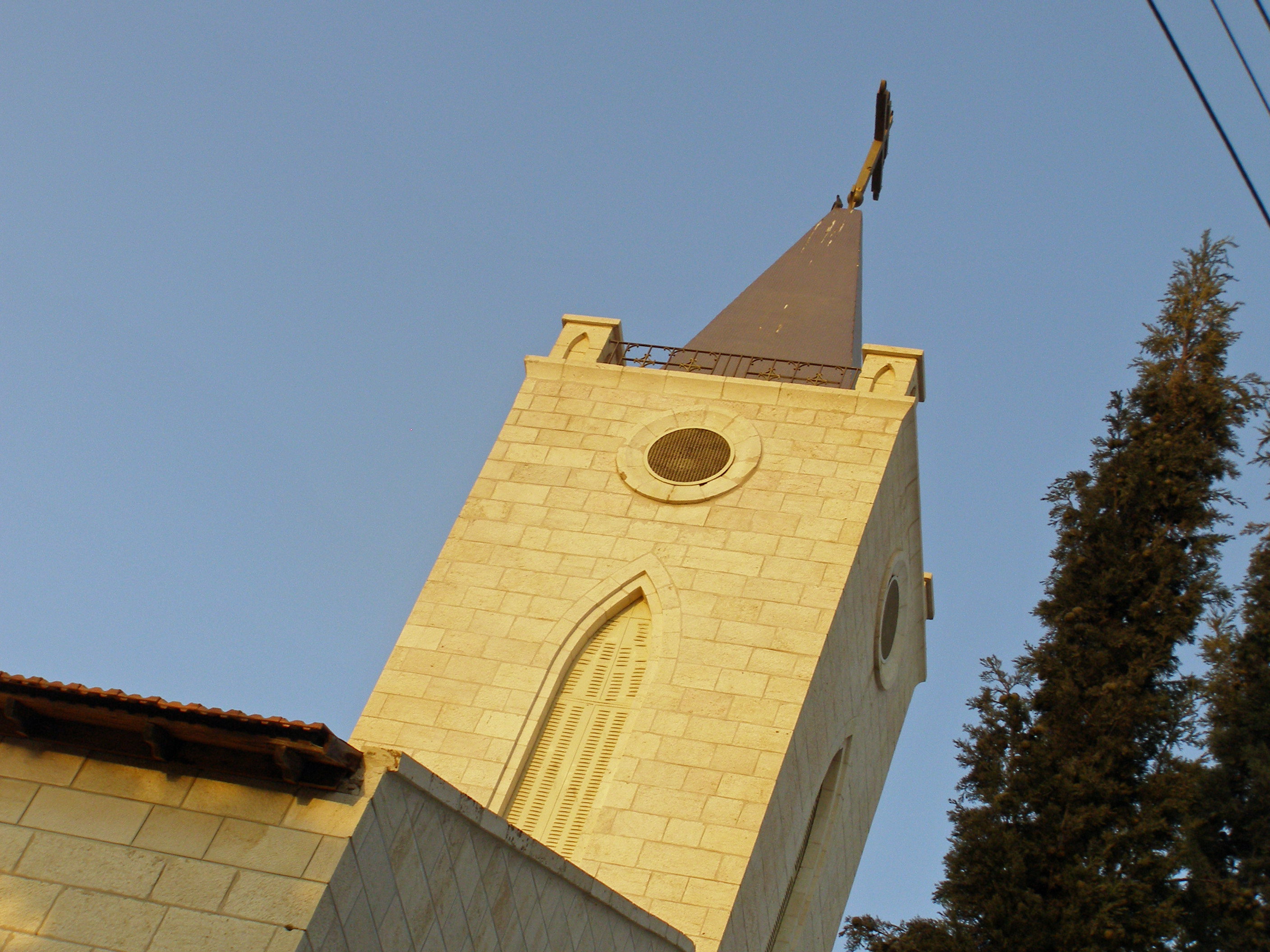
- St. Joseph's Church
- Location: Amman
- Country: Jordan
- Denomination: Roman Catholic Church

The St. Joseph's Church (Arabic: كنيسة القديس يوسف), also alternatively called "Latin Church of Jabal Amman", is a religious building belonging to the Catholic Church in Amman, the capital of the Hashemite Kingdom of Jordan.

As its name suggests, the church is dedicated to Joseph of Nazareth. It is one of the parishes under the responsibility of the Latin Patriarchate of Jerusalem (Patriarcha Hierosolymitanus Latinorum).

In 2015 the church not only lent religious services but served to house refugees who fled the war in Iraq. This initiative also adopted more than 40 churches around the country, just after King Abdullah II of Jordan extended an invitation to Iraqi Christians to come to Jordan, and the Vatican announced the approval of funds to help them.

== See also ==
- Roman Catholicism in Jordan
- St. Joseph's Church (disambiguation)
