= Virgin Mary Coptic Orthodox Church (Jordan) =

- كنيسة السيدة العذراء للأقباط الأرثوذكس
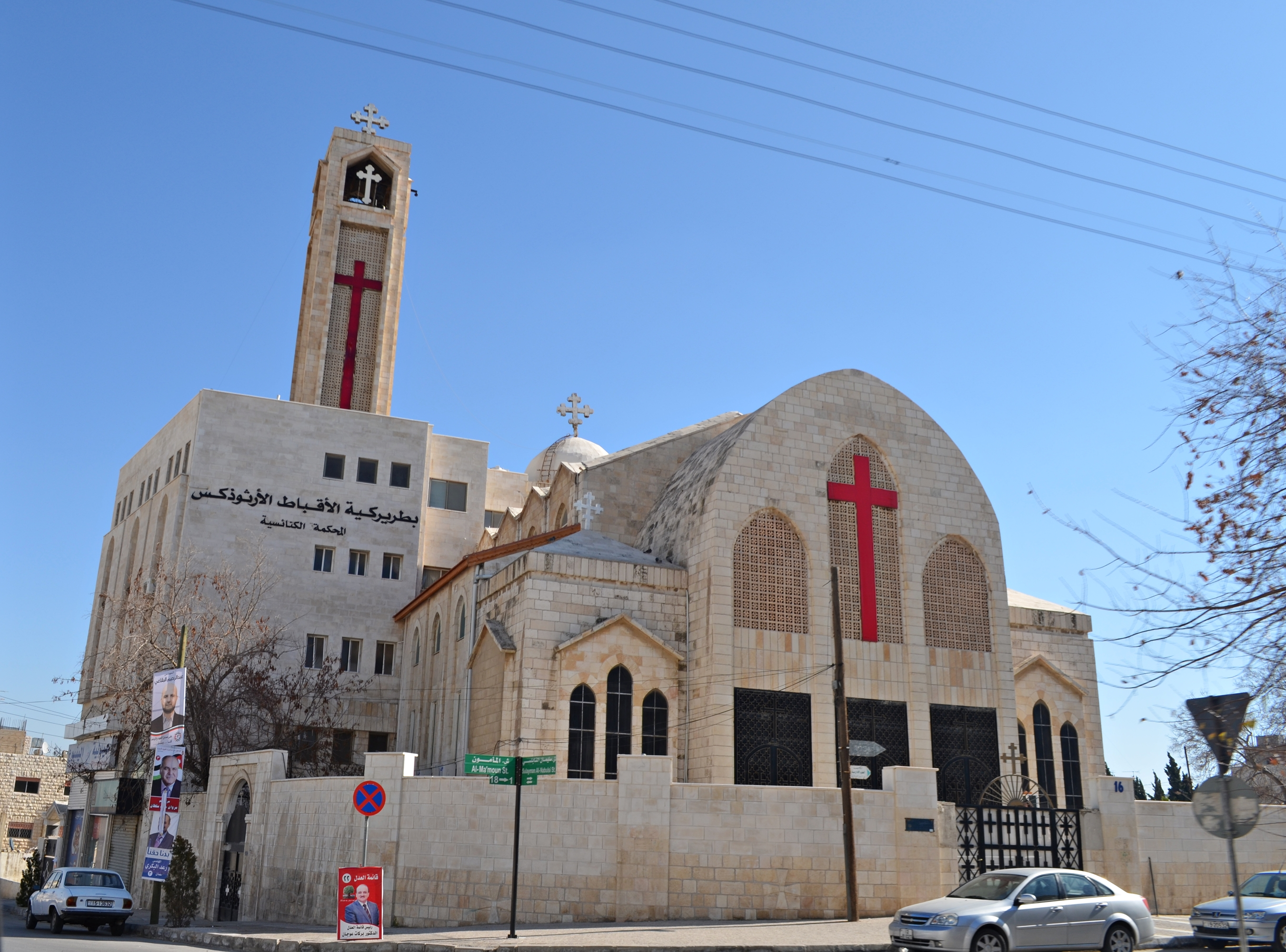
- Virgin Mary Coptic Orthodox Church
- 31°57′37″N 35°54′44″E
- Location: Amman
- Country: Jordan
- Denomination: Coptic Orthodox Church

History
- Founded: 2005

Virgin Mary Church is a Coptic Orthodox Church located in Amman, Jordan.

The church lies in front of the King Abdullah I Mosque in the Abdali district, and was built during Pope Shenouda III of Alexandria's visit to Jordan in 2005.
