= Eastern Orthodoxy in Jordan =

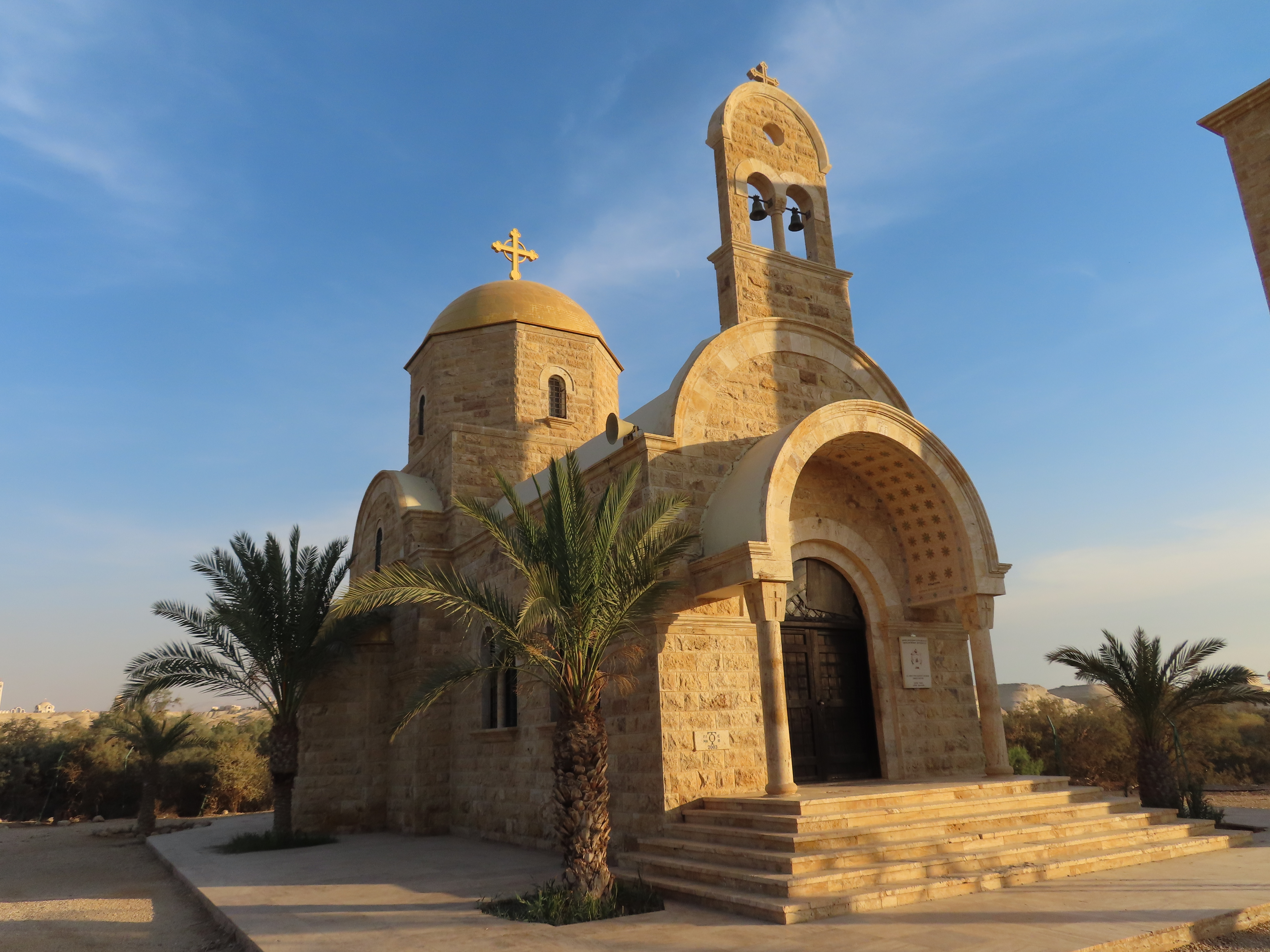
The Greek Orthodox Church of St. John the Baptist at Al-Maghtas, Jordan.

Eastern Orthodox Christians in Jordan are primarily under the jurisdiction of the Eastern Orthodox Patriarchate of Jerusalem, with some communities under the Eastern Orthodox Patriarchate of Antioch.

In 2020, Christians accounted for 2.1% of Jordan's population. Approximately half of these (around 1.05%) are Orthodox Christians.

The Jordanian Eastern Orthodox Christian population is estimated at 120,000, most of whom are Arabic-speaking, or, by some accounts, more than 300,000. In 2017, there were 29 Eastern Orthodox churches – with that number on the increase – all of which fall under the Jerusalem Patriarchate. Most Eastern Orthodox Christians live in Amman and surrounding areas. The Jerusalem Patriarchate has historically been noted for its pan-Arab orientation, reflecting its presence in various parts of the Arab world.

Converts from Islam to Christianity may face the loss of civil rights. Christmas and the Gregorian calendar New Year are recognized public holidays in Jordan.

As of 2022, the Greek Orthodox, Armenian Apostolic, and Syriac Orthodox churches are all officially recognized by the Jordanian government.

The towns of Fuheis and Al Husn have predominantly Orthodox populations.

== History ==
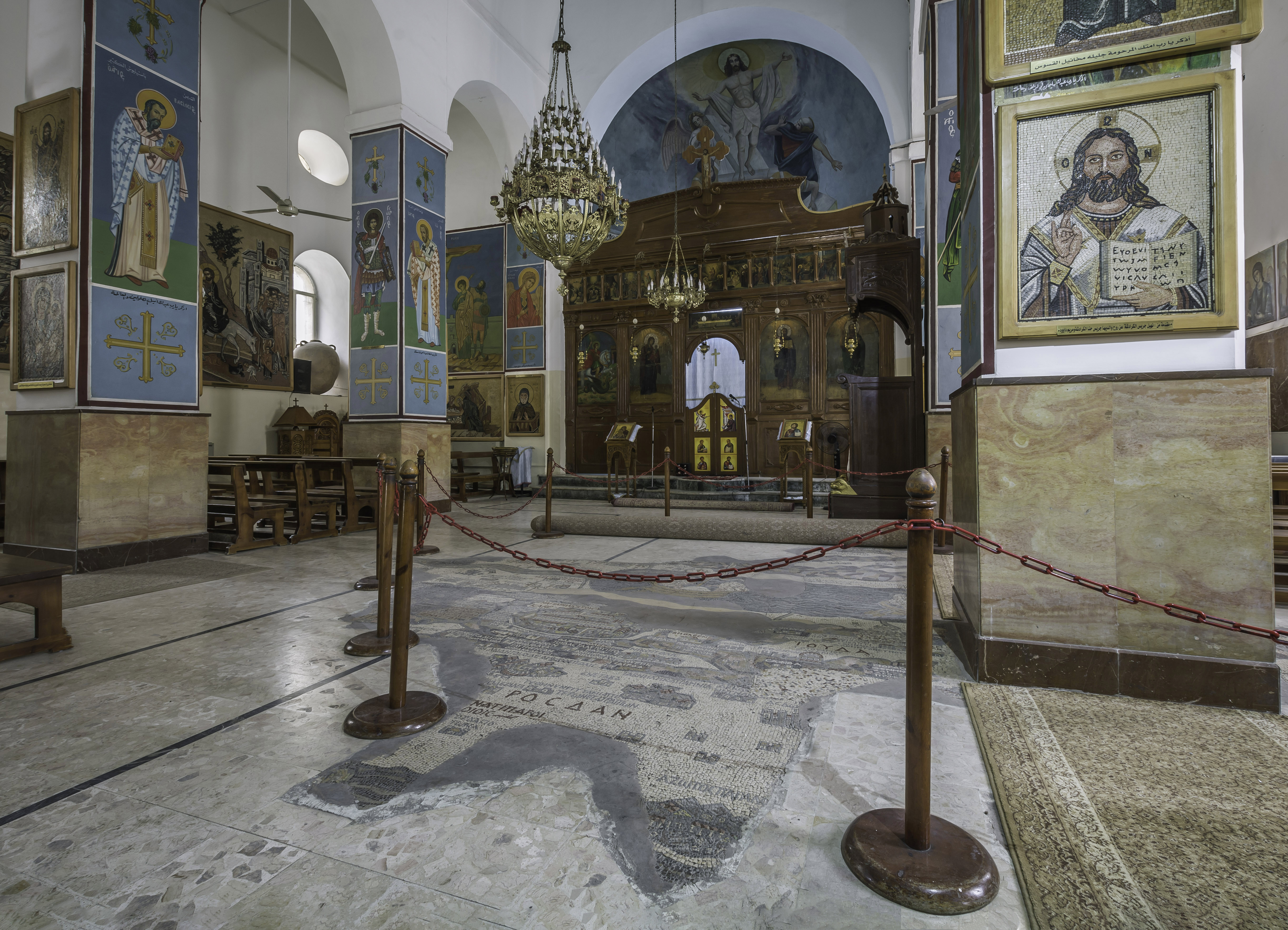
The Madaba Map in St. George Church, Madaba, Jordan, is a 6th-century Byzantine floor mosaic depicting the Middle East and the oldest surviving cartographic representation of the Holy Land, especially Jerusalem.

Eastern Orthodoxy has maintained a continuous presence in the area of modern Jordan for over fifteen centuries. The faith was established during the Byzantine period, when the region was incorporated into the Eastern Roman Empire. Towns such as Madaba, Amman, Mount Nebo, and Al-Karak functioned as centers of ecclesiastical activity, hosting basilicas, chapels, monasteries, and schools. Archaeological evidence, including mosaics depicting biblical scenes, inscriptions in Greek, and church architectural remains, reflects both local devotion and Byzantine artistic traditions. Monasticism developed along pilgrimage routes, providing spiritual guidance, education, and social services, while bishops reported to the Patriarchate of Jerusalem.

Following the Muslim conquest in the mid-7th century, Orthodox Christians continued to reside in the region as a recognized religious community under Islamic administration. They were permitted to maintain churches, operate schools, and practice their faith while paying the jizya tax. Arabic gradually supplanted Greek and Syriac as the vernacular, although Greek persisted in liturgical contexts. Towns such as Madaba, Fuheis, and Al Husn retained Orthodox populations, with clergy fulfilling both religious and civic functions.

During the Crusader period, Crusaders captured a portion of Jordan, which became known as the Lordship of Transjordan. Relations between eastern Christians and the Latin Crusaders were complex, involving periods of cooperation as well as tension. Following the Crusader period, the Mamluk Sultanate allowed Orthodox Christians to continue practicing their religion, maintaining churches, monastic communities, and educational institutions while paying specific taxes.

After World War I and the dissolution of the Ottoman Empire, Transjordan came under British administration. Orthodox Christians retained recognition of their churches, schools, and social institutions. Communities in Amman, Madaba, and Fuheis expanded. Upon Jordanian independence in 1946, the Orthodox Church was officially recognized by the state.

In contemporary Jordan, Orthodox communities remain active in towns including Fuheis, Al Husn, and Amman. The Patriarchate of Jerusalem oversees parishes and monasteries, ensuring the continuation of liturgical traditions, religious education, and the restoration of historical sites.

== See also ==
- Religion in Jordan
- Christianity in Jordan
- Ghassanids
- Freedom of religion in Jordan
- Christianity in the Middle East
- Eastern Orthodoxy in Syria
- Eastern Orthodoxy in Lebanon
- Eastern Orthodoxy in Iraq
- Eastern Orthodoxy in Saudi Arabia
- Eastern Orthodoxy in Egypt

== Sources ==
- Corbon, Jean (1998). "The Churches of the Middle East: Their Origins and Identity, from their Roots in the Past to their Openness to the Present". Christian Communities in the Arab Middle East: The Challenge of the Future. Oxford: Clarendon Press. pp. 92–110. ISBN 978-0-19-829388-0.
- Dick, Iganatios (2004). Melkites: Greek Orthodox and Greek Catholics of the Patriarchates of Antioch, Alexandria and Jerusalem. Roslindale, MA: Sophia Press. Archived from the original on 2023-06-08.
- Grillmeier, Aloys; Hainthaler, Theresia (2013). Christ in Christian Tradition: The Churches of Jerusalem and Antioch from 451 to 600. Vol. 2/3. Oxford: Oxford University Press. ISBN 978-0-19-921288-0.
- Hohmann, Gregory (2000). "Loyalty to the Emperor and Change of Rite: What Induced the Melkite Church to Exchange the Syrian for the Byzantine Tradition". The Harp. 13: 49–56. doi:10.31826/9781463233013-008. ISBN 9781463233013.
- Kennedy, Hugh N. (2000). "The Early Development of Church Architecture in Syria and Jordan, c. 300–c. 750". The Holy Land, Holy Lands, and Christian History. Woodbridge: Suffolk: Boydell Press. pp. 1–33. ISBN 9780952973355.
- Meyendorff, John (1989). Imperial unity and Christian divisions: The Church 450-680 A.D. Crestwood, NY: St. Vladimir's Seminary Press. ISBN 9780881410563.
- Ostrogorsky, George (1956). History of the Byzantine State. Oxford: Basil Blackwell.
- Panchenko, Constantin A. (2021). Orthodoxy and Islam in the Middle East: The Seventh to the Sixteenth Centuries. Jordanville, NY: Holy Trinity Publications. ISBN 9781942699330.
- Roussos, Sotiris (2010). "Eastern Orthodox Christianity in the Middle East". Eastern Christianity in the Modern Middle East. London-New York: Routledge. pp. 107–119. ISBN 9781135193713.
