= Jordanian Interfaith Coexistence Research Center =

Jordan Interfaith Coexistence Research Center (JICRC)
- Abbreviation: JICRC
- Formation: 2003
- Type: Non-governmental organization
- Purpose: Promotion of the values of peaceful interfaith coexistence.
- Headquarters: Amman
- Location: Jordan
- Region served: Middle East
- Key people: Nabil D. Haddad (Executive Director); Izziddeen al Khateeb Al Tameemi (Chairman); Sami Gammoh (Vice Chairman)
- Website: Coexistence Jordan

The Jordanian Interfaith Coexistence Research Center (or JICRC) is a non-governmental organization for promoting peaceful religious coexistence based out of Amman, Jordan. It focuses on fostering interfaith dialogue on a grassroots level and creating interreligious harmony. The JICRC is currently run by its founder and director, Father Nabil Haddad.

== History ==
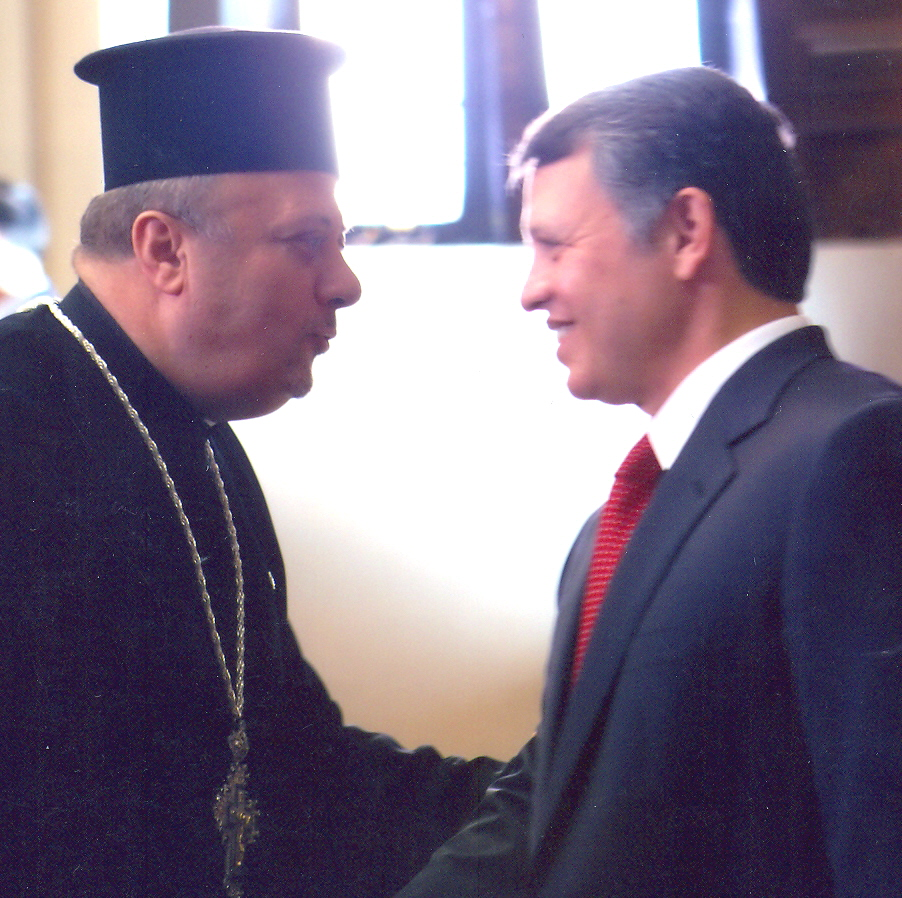
JICRC founder Nabil Haddad with King Abdullah II.

Father Nabil Haddad established the JICRC in 2003. He founded the center on what he described as “the belief that an approach of togetherness is needed to expand upon the conviction that all values, morals, and religions guide us to peace. JICRC calls for mutual respect and dignity for all people as human beings by emphasizing that we are all children of Adam.”

== Location ==
The JICRC is based out of its headquarters on Jabal al-Luweibdeh in Amman, Jordan. It is situated in between Luzmilla Hospital and the site of the oldest cathedral in Jordan.

== Work ==
The JICRC participates in many interfaith dialogue events. It has worked with the US Department of State and the US nonprofit Amideast program. Public figures including John Kerry and Laura Bush have publicly commended the JICRC for its interfaith dialogue work.

The JICRC plays an advisory role to both the Jordanian Government and other non-governmental organizations. The center also holds events in collaboration with the government to promote interfaith harmony, such as its February 2011 “Harmony: Jordan as a Model”, a celebration of the United Nations’ World Interfaith Harmony Week held in concert with the Jordanian Ministry of Islamic Affairs under the patronage of Prince Ghazi bin Mohammad.

The JICRC frequently hosts visiting groups of students, religious leaders, politicians, and academics. The JICRC also offers an internship program for current students and recent graduates.

== Programs ==
The JICRC continues to be globally active through hosting and attending various conferences to promote interfaith dialogue and peaceful coexistence among different faiths. Over the past decade, the JICRC has launched several successful programs which seek to foster positive interfaith relations in Jordan, in the Middle East, and around the world.

"Imams for Coexistence" is an effort to present to other societies the moderate voices of the Muslim world working for harmony, tolerance, moderation, and peaceful coexistence with others. This program brought imams to the United States in order to introduce young, progressive leaders to the culture, history, and society of the West and allow them to witness how different religions are expressed and peacefully in the western realm. "Imams for Coexistence" also gives the imams opportunities to interact with western societies in a positive and constructive way through participating in dialogues at public events, where they can discuss Islamic perspectives on human rights, democracy, and gender, while allowing them to address misconceptions and misunderstandings of Islam prevalent in a post-September 11 American and western society.

"Women for Coexistence" consists of initiatives of workshops, camps and conferences, which provide an open forum for women to interact using the core interfaith values as a foundation for building harmony, religious coexistence, cultural understanding, gender equality, and peace.

"Youth for Coexistence" provides a venue for Muslim and Christian youth to dialogue and to build relationships of respect and understanding. Youth who have the passion and the capacity to promote peace and understanding between the faith traditions will become the most effective future spokespersons for the cause of peaceful coexistence. The program includes conferences, camps and workshops. The purpose of this program is to involve youth in the development of grass roots program initiatives related to the JICRC’s Document on Islamic-Christian Interfaith Coexistence.

"Media and Coexistence" is a newer project which seeks to promote balanced portrayal of interfaith relations in Jordanian media, empowering young journalists to use social media and learn more about the Jordanian model of interfaith harmony.

== See also ==
- Amman Message
- Christianity in Jordan
- Islam in Jordan
- Religion in Jordan
