= Mikhayl Assaf =

- Archeparch of Petra and Philadelphia in Amman
- Native name: مايكل عساف
- Church: Melkite Greek Catholic Church
- Archdiocese: Melkite Greek Catholic Archeparchy of Petra and Philadelphia in Amman
- In office: 19 September 1948 – 10 August 1970
- Predecessor: Paul Salman
- Successor: Saba Youakim
- Previous post: Patriarchal Vicar of Jerusalem (1948)

Orders
- Ordination: 20 July 1912
- Consecration: 10 October 1948 by Anthony Farage

Personal details
- Born: 27 October 1887 Damascus, Syria vilayet, Ottoman Empire
- Died: 10 August 1970 (aged 82)

Mikhayl Assaf (27 October 1887 in Damascus, Syria – 10 August 1970) was the second archbishop of the Melkite Greek Catholic Church of the Melkite Greek Catholic Archeparchy of Petra and Philadelphia in Amman. He was the successor to Archbishop Paul Salman.

== Life ==
On July 20, 1912, Mikhayl Assaf became an ordained priest. His election as Archbishop of Petra and Philadelphia was on 19 September 1948, and his ordination as eparch was on October 10, 1948. In his twenty years in office, Assaf was a Council Father of the first two sessions of the Second Vatican Council. He consecrated Nicolas Naaman, SMSP, as Archbishop of Bosra and Hauran (Syria). He also assisted as co-consecrator of Gabriel Abdou-Saada to Titular of Caesarea in Palestine of Greek Melkites, Georges Haddad as Archbishop of Tyre (Lebanon), Giacomo Giuseppe Beltritti as the Latin Patriarch of Jerusalem of the Melkite Church and Neemeh Simann as titular bishop of Termessus. Assaf was succeeded by Saba Youakim when he died in 1970.
