= Druze in Jordan =

Religious and ethnic group

Jordanian Druze people
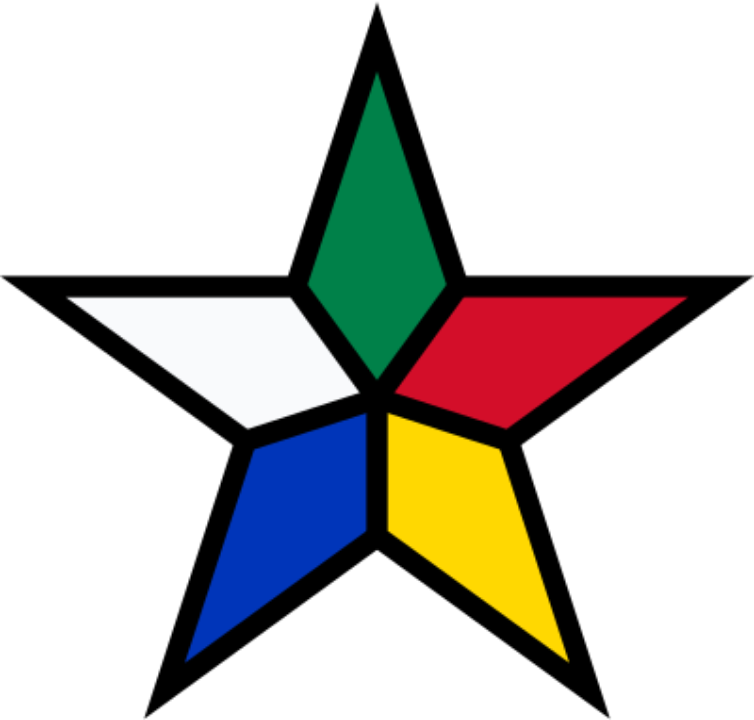
- Druze star and Druze flag

Total population
- 20,000+

Languages
- Vernacular: Levantine Arabic

Religion
- Druze faith

Druze in Jordan refers to adherents of the Druze faith, an ethnoreligious esoteric group originating from the Near East who self identify as monotheists (Muwaḥḥidūn). Druze faith is a monotheistic and Abrahamic religion, and Druze do not identify as Muslims.

The Jordanian Druze people are estimated to number at least 20,000, as of 2005. The Druze, who refer to themselves as al-Muwahhideen, or "believers in one God," are concentrated in the rural, mountainous areas west and north of Amman. The Jordanian government classifies the Druze as Muslims.

== History ==
The Druze faith is a monotheistic Abrahamic religion that does not follow the Five Pillars of Islam, "fasting during the month of Ramadan and making a pilgrimage to Mecca. Thus, they are not regarded by Muslims as Islamic". The Druze beliefs incorporate elements of Ismailism, Gnosticism, Neoplatonism and other philosophies. The Druze call themselves Ahl al-Tawhid "People of Unitarianism or Monotheism" or al-Muwaḥḥidūn."

The Druze follow a life style of isolation where no conversion is allowed, neither out of, or into, the religion. When Druze live among people of other religions, they try to blend in, in order to protect their religion and their own safety. They can pray as Muslims, or as Christians, depending on where they are. This system is apparently changing in modern times, where more security has allowed Druze to be more open about their religious belonging."

Some of Arabians from the Tanukh inaugurated the Druze community in Jordan when most of them accepted and adopted the new message that was being preached in the 11th century, due to their leadership's close ties with then Fatimid ruler Al-Hakim bi-Amr Allah.

Historically the relationship between the Druze and Muslims has been characterized by intense persecution. The Druze faith is often classified as a branch of Isma'ili. Even though the faith originally developed out of Ismaili Islam, most Druze do not identify as Muslims, and they do not accept the five pillars of Islam. The Druze have frequently experienced persecution by different Muslim regimes such as the Shia Fatimid Caliphate, Sunni Ottoman Empire, and Egypt Eyalet. The persecution of the Druze included massacres, demolishing Druze prayer houses and holy places and forced conversion to Islam. According to the Druze narrative, those were no ordinary killings; they were meant to eradicate the whole community.

== Demographics ==
The Druze, who refer to themselves as al-Muwahhideen, or "believers in one God," are concentrated in the rural, mountainous areas north and west of Amman. As of 2005, the Jordanian Druze were estimated to be at least 20,000 people, out of Jordan's population of approximately 6.3 million.

== Role in society ==
The Jordanian government records the Druze as Muslims in civil documents that identify the bearer's religious affiliation, without public objection from the Druze community. However, Druze have continued to report discrimination, and the manner in which constituencies have been geographically distributed have hindered Druze from reaching high positions in civil service and official departments. Of the 138 seats in the Parliament of Jordan, 9 are reserved for Christians and the remainder for Muslims. None are reserved for Druze; however, Druze (being classified as Muslims) may hold office as Muslims. Druze have achieved general officer rank in the military and have served in parliament. As of 2022, there is one Druze cabinet member, foreign minister Ayman Safadi.

== Notable people ==
- Rashid Tali’a
- Ayman Safadi

== See also ==
- Jabal al-Druze
- Druze
- Islam in Jordan
- Religion in Jordan
- Azraq, Jordan
- Jabal Druze State
