= Nakithoun =

Islamic group

Nakithoun (English: "Renegades") is an Islamist organization led by Abu Rami that split from Hizb ut-Tahrir, another Islamist organization. It is particularly strong in support in Jordan.
