= Melkite Greek Catholic Archeparchy of Petra and Philadelphia in Amman =

Eastern Catholic archeparchy in Jordan

Coordinates: 31.9500°N 35.9333°E

Archeparchy of Petra and Philadelphia in Amman (Melkite Greek) Archeparchy Petrensis et Philadelphiensis

Location
- Country: Jordan

Statistics
- Population: (as of 2007); 27,000
- Parishes: 28

Information
- Denomination: Melkite Greek Catholic Church
- Rite: Byzantine Rite
- Established: 1932
- Cathedral: Saint George Cathedral

Current leadership
- Pope: Leo XIV
- Patriarch: Youssef Absi
- Archeparch: Eduard Daher
- Bishops emeritus: Yasser Ayyash, Joseph Gébara

The Melkite Greek Catholic Archeparchy of Petra and Philadelphia in Amman (Latin: Archeparchy Petrensis et Philadelphiensis) is a branch of the Melkite Greek Catholic Church immediately subject to the Patriarchate of Antioch of the Melkites. Eduard Daher, B.C. was elected Archeparch on October 17, 2026.

== Territory and statistics ==
The archeparchy has jurisdiction over all the faithful of the Melkite Greek Catholic Church in Jordan.

The archeparchial seat is the city of Amman, in Cathedral of St. George.

The territory is divided into 28 parishes. The archeparchy at the end of 2007 counted 27,000 baptized members.

== History ==
The Archeparchy of Transjordan was erected on May 2, 1932 with the Papal bull Apostolica Sedes, issued by Pope Pius XI.

The Northern Territory was part of the Melkite Greek Catholic Archeparchy of Bosra and Hauran, while the rest of the territory was part of the ancient metropolis of the Archbishop of Petra. In this area in the early twentieth century were established missions both by the Latin Patriarch of Jerusalem.

The foundation of the Archieparchy was the occasion of a comparison between the Melkite Patriarch of Antioch and the Holy See. The patriarch thought that the erection of the ecclesiastical jurisdiction depended on him, as the new home was an integral part of his patriarchate. Rome instead started from the principle that most of the territory of the new eparchy depended on the Patriarchate of Jerusalem, of which the patriarch of Antioch was only administrator, and that the conditions of this administration had never been determined or clarified.

The archeparchy assumed the name of Transjordan, terminology foreign to the history and tradition not only of the Melkite Church, but of all the Christian East. Moreover, the same bull adds that Transjordaniam regionem in veram ac propriam archidioecesim erigimus et constituimus, without specifying further whether "archidioecesis" meant a home or an autocephalous metropolis of distinct groups in the oriental canon law.

Patriarch Cyril IX Moghabghab consecrated in Cairo June 5, 1932 the first archeparch Paul Salman, entrusting him with the title of Metropolitan of Petra, Philadelphia and Transjordan. This title refers to two ancient sites, Petra and Philadelphia of Palestine of Arabia: the first is a metropolitan see and the second a simple suffragan dioceses; the first part of the Patriarchate of Jerusalem, the second that of Antioch. According to Korolevsky, these inaccuracies are signs of "complete absence of knowledge on the subject of ecclesiastical geography ancient and traditional".

== Archeparchs ==
- Paul Salman (May 2, 1932 - 1 July 1948 deceased)
- Mikhayl Assaf (September 19, 1948 - August 10, 1970 deceased)
- Saba Youakim, B.S. (October 15, 1970 - August 24, 1992 withdrawn)
- Georges El-Murr, B.C. (August 26, 1992 - June 18, 2007 withdrawn)
- Yasser Ayyash (June 21, 2007 - April 14, 2015 resigned)
- Joseph Gébara (February 20, 2018 - October 17 2026 resigned)
- Eduard Daher, B.C. (since October 17 2026)
