= King Abdullah I Mosque =

Mosque in Amman, Jordan

- مسجد الملك عبد الله الأول
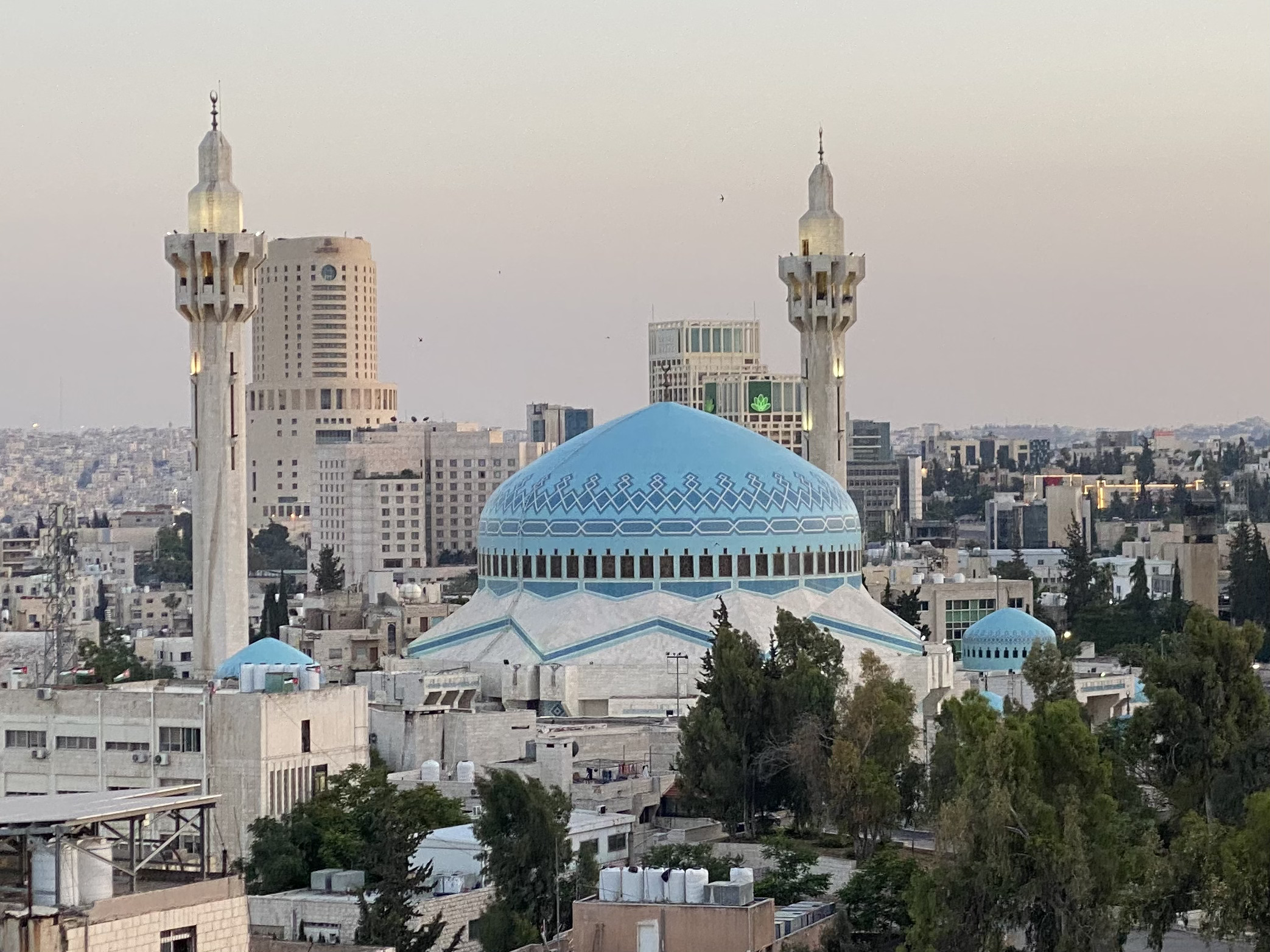
- The mosque in 2024

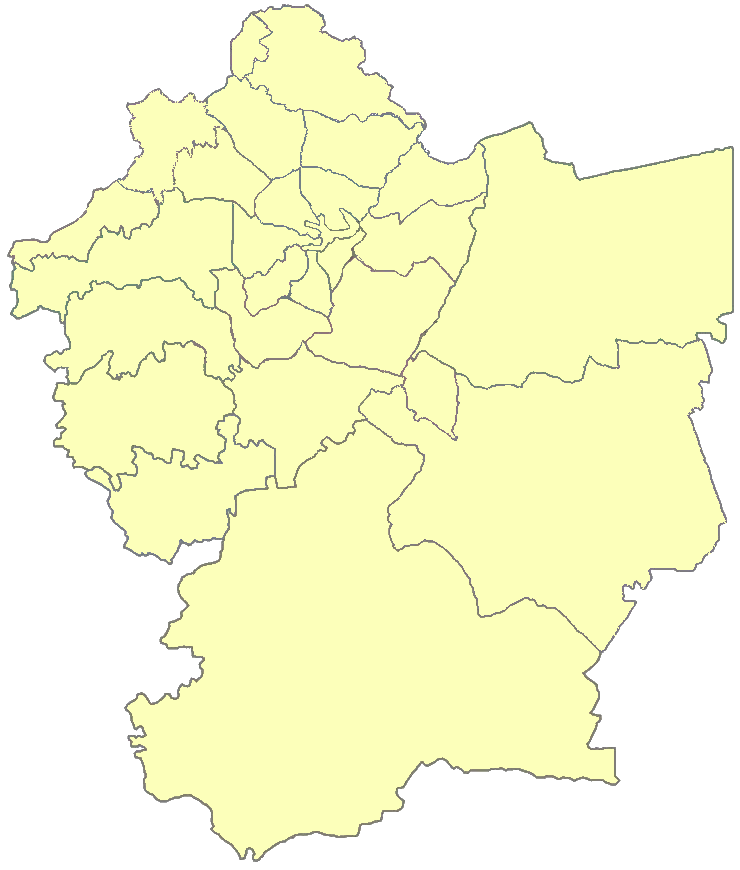
- Location of the mosque in Amman

Religion
- Affiliation: Islam
- Ecclesiastical or organizational status: Mosque
- Status: Active

Location
- Location: Amman
- Country: Jordan
- Interactive map of King Abdullah I Mosque
- Administration: Ministry of Endowments, Islamic Affairs and Holy Places
- Coordinates: 31°57′42″N 35°54′47″E

Architecture
- Type: Mosque architecture
- Completed: 1989

Specifications
- Capacity: 10,000 worshippers
- Dome: One
- Minaret: Two
- Site area: 18,000 m^{2} (190,000 sq ft)

Website
- www.awqaf.gov.jo/pages.php?menu_id=52

The King Abdullah I Mosque (Arabic: مسجد الملك عبد الله الأول) is a mosque, located in Amman, Jordan. Named in honour of Abdullah I, the mosque was built between 1982 and 1989 and is capped by a blue mosaic dome beneath which 3,000 Muslims may offer prayer. It is in the Abdali area of the city.

Tourists are allowed to visit. Men must have long trousers on and women must cover their heads, arms and legs. A hooded gown is provided free of charge for this purpose.

== Gallery ==
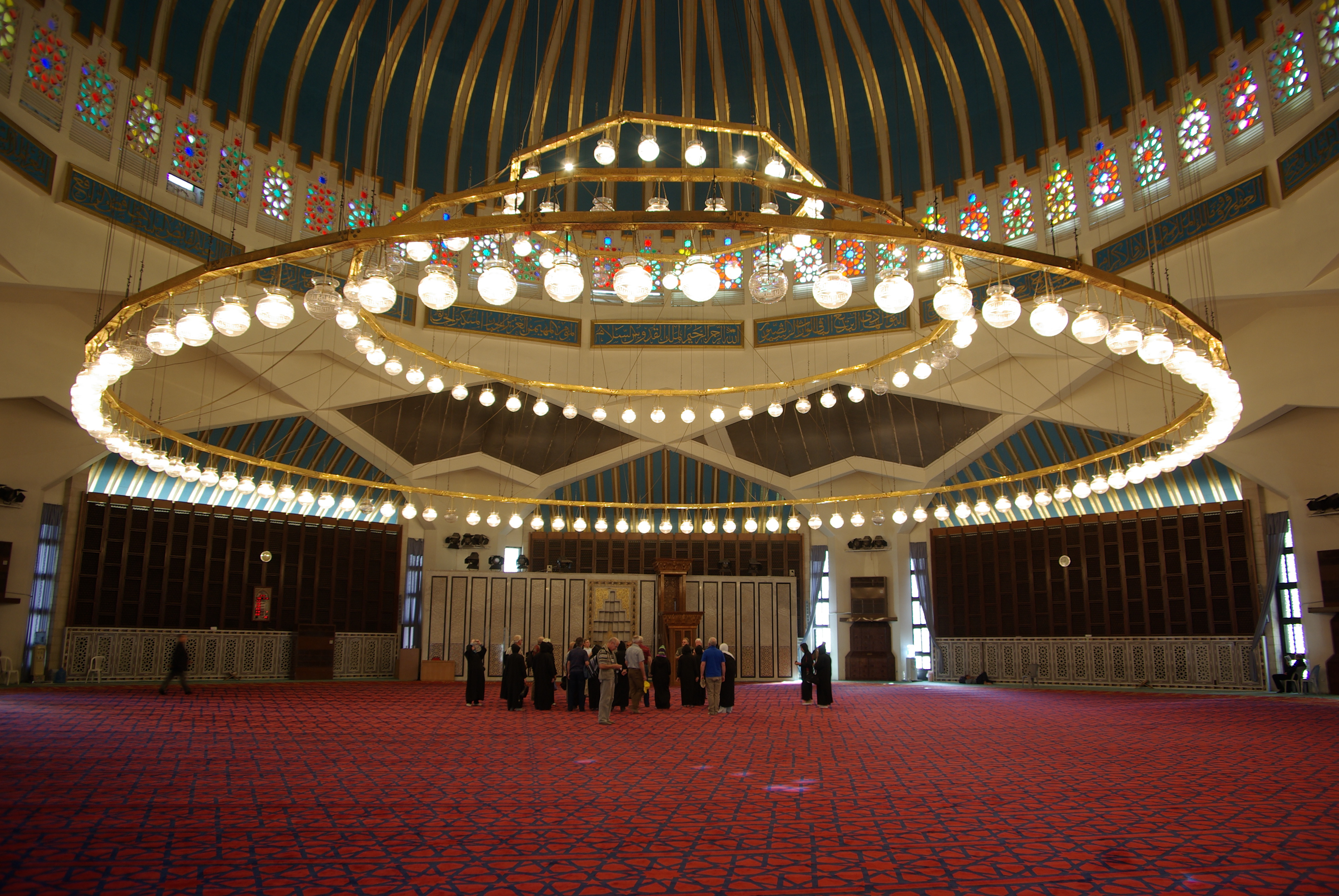
Interior of the mosque

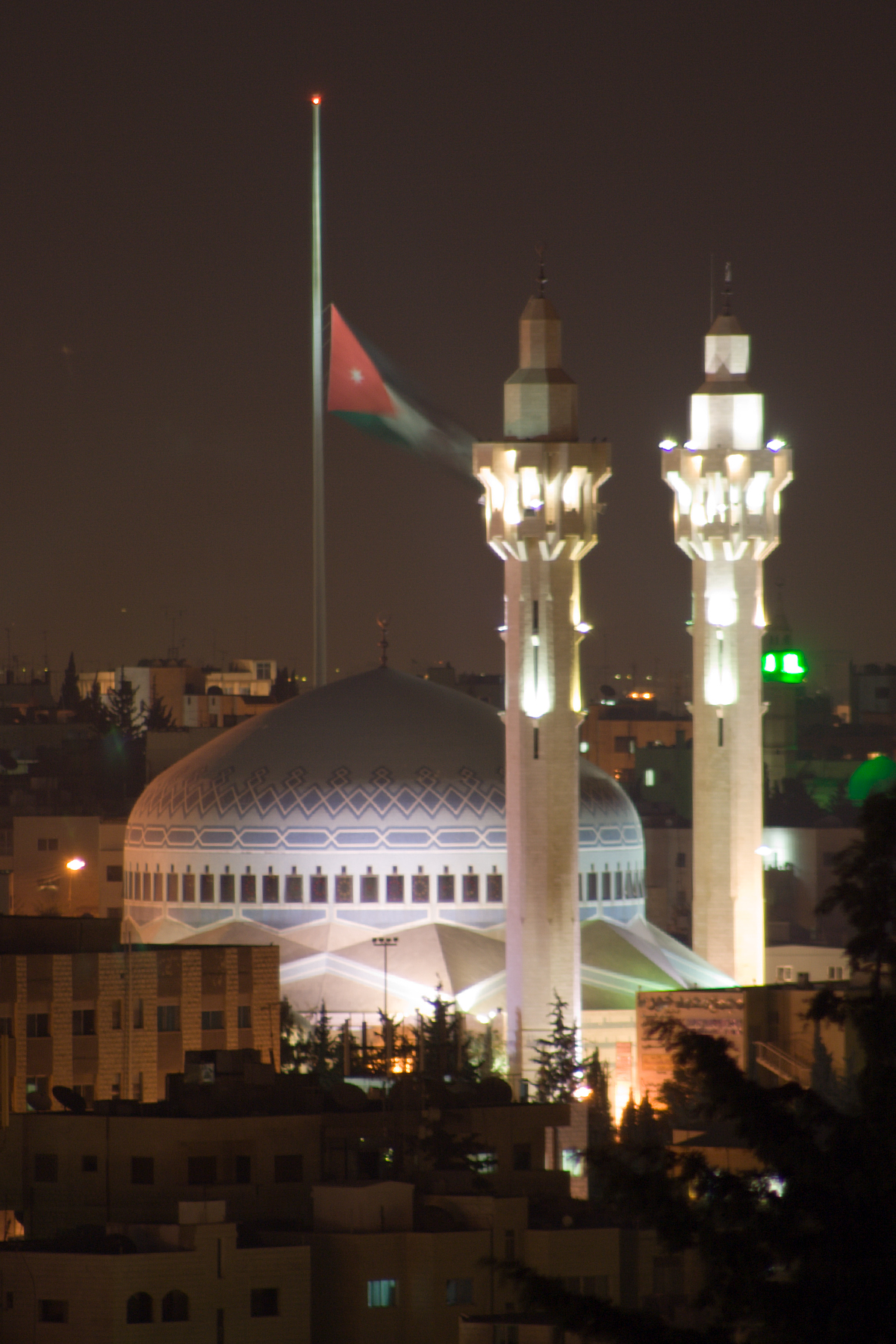
The mosque at night

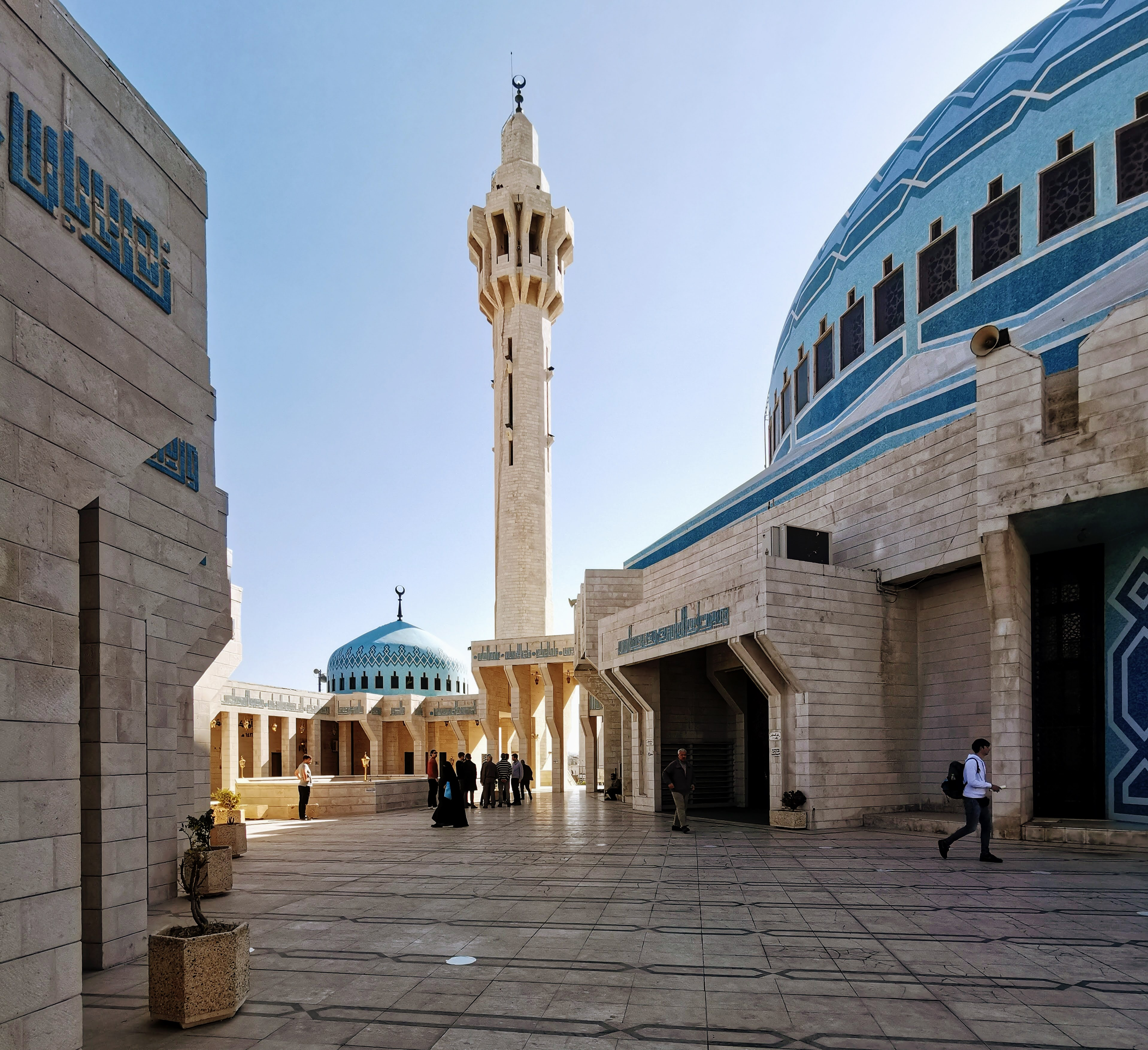
The mosque

== See also ==
- Islam in Jordan
- List of mosques in Jordan
