= Fuheis =

Fuheis الفحيص
- Town
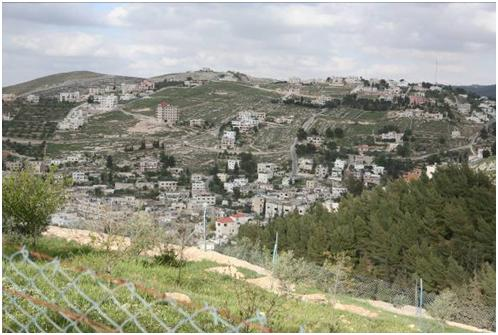

- Location in Jordan
- Coordinates: 32°01′N 35°46′E
- Grid position: 223/157
- Country: Jordan
- Governorate: Balqa Governorate
- Municipality established: 1962

Government
  - Type: Municipality

Area
  - Metro: 6.6 sq mi (17 km^{2})
- Elevation: 2,430–3,440 ft (740–1,050 m)

Population (2021)
  - Town: 21,908
  - Religions: 60% Greek Orthodox 35% Catholics 5% others mainly Sunni Muslims
- Time zone: GMT +3
- Area code: +(962)/6

Fuheis (Arabic: الفحيص) is a Christian majority town in the central Jordanian governorate of Balqa. It lies in between Salt and Amman, at a distance of 6 and 13 kilometers respectively.

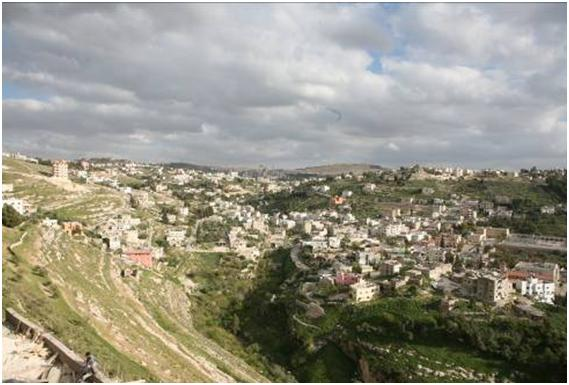
View of the town from above

The population of Fuheis was estimated to be 21,908 in 2021, 87% are Jordanian citizens, 95% are Christians, and with a male-to-female ratio of 52:48.

According to a national census in 2015, the population was 18,916, there were 4,658 households in the town with an average of 4.06 persons per household, lower than the national average of 4.82 persons per household. The population of Fuheis increases in the summer, as many of the town's residents who have emigrated to the United States and Europe return for their summer vacations. The town's elevation renders it cool enough to spend the summer comfortably.

Fuheis is also famous for its traditional habits from singing and dancing (dabke), and for depending on its farms.

== History ==
In 1838 Fuheis was noted located east of Al-Salt.

The Jordanian census of 1961 found 2,946 inhabitants in Fuheis, of whom 2,391 were Christians.

== Geography and climate ==
The town has an elevation ranging from 740 to 1,050 meters (2,430 to 3,440 ft) above mean sea level, and experiences a hot-summer Mediterranean climate (Köppen: Csa). It receives approximately 500 mm (20 in) of precipitation annually, with occasional snowfall accumulating on its peaks.

== Economy and development ==
Fuheis' economy has historically centered around agriculture. Most of Fuheis' population works in agriculture, trade, cement industry, service industry, and civil or office jobs. The olive industry is important to Fuheis' economy, along with orchards and vineyards. The cement factory - Jordan's largest - is by far the largest industry in Fuheis, employing about 70% of the town's population. Among its most important villages are al-Rahwa, Ras al-Jundi, and al-Suqariah, known for their farms and trees.

In 2010, German researchers from the Helmholtz Centre for Environmental Research implemented a demonstration facility for decentralised wastewater technology in Fuheis. The project was handed over to the management of Al-Balqa` Applied University.

== Religion ==
Approximately 60% of the town's population belong to Greek Orthodox Church of Jerusalem, 35% are members of the Latin Patriarchate of Jerusalem. Sunni Muslims and Armenian Orthodox Christians make up the remaining 5% of the population. The Latin Parish of Fuheis established a secondary school during the Ottoman Period in 1885. Students of this school learned Arabic, Religion and Math. The school has since expanded, remaining open until today.

== Heritage and archaeology ==
Archaeological excavations in Fuheis uncovered a circular building from white limestone which dates back to the Iron Age and the Byzantine age. This building was repurposed as a church in the Ayyubid and Mamluk periods, and within the building is a blueprint of the church in addition to a number of graves that were built in the church's land. The excavations suggest that the area's water sources may have drawn many to the region or that the settlement had a military purpose. The ruins are surrounded by small dug wells and enclosed water closets which were connected by a spout carved from rock. In the same area, excavators found a carving on basalt rock in Greek letters and crosses carved into limestone.

== Culture ==
=== Al-Rowaq ===
Fuheis' Rowaq Al-Balqa' district boasts hundred-year-old stone cottages in the old town, preserved by a local who bought an art gallery in the area and proceeded to buy several cottages near it, converting them to art-and-craft shops.

== Tourism and Outdoor Activities ==
Fuhais is increasingly recognized not only for its historical and cultural significance but also for its emerging outdoor activities, particularly rock climbing.

=== Rock Climbing ===
Fuhais has become a notable climbing destination in Jordan, attracting local and international climbers. The area features limestone cliffs with multiple bolted sport routes of varying difficulty, making it a popular alternative to the traditional climbing of Wadi Rum.

The development of climbing routes in Fuhais was pioneered by Hakim Tamimi, a Jordanian climber who has been instrumental in bolting sport climbing areas across the country. His contributions to Fuhais and other climbing areas such as Dur Morsud and Iraq Al Dub have been documented in international climbing reports and academic studies.

Several international climbing events and trips have been hosted in Fuhais, contributing to Jordan's growing reputation as a Middle Eastern climbing hub. Climbers visiting Fuhais often combine their trip with other adventure activities in nearby regions, further supporting adventure tourism in Jordan.

More information on climbing routes and conditions can be found on adventure platforms and climbing community websites.

=== Fuheis festival ===
Fuheis Festival is an annually held event in Fuheis, and it is considered to be the second biggest festival in Jordan, after Jerash Festival.

They have celebrated their silver jubilee in 2016, where they have welcomed bands and artists from Jordan, Syria, Palestine and Lebanon to perform in concerts and poetry evenings.

Several artists and singers from across the region were invited to perform in the town, like: Wadih El Safi, Melhem Barakat, Sabah Fakhri, Fares Karam, Moeen Charif, Omar Al-Abdallat, George Kurdahi, Najwa Karam, and many more, and the variety of night events and activities attracts around 10,000 to 30,000 visitors yearly.

== List of mayors of Fuhais ==
Rank	Mayor	Term
1	Fahad Sweiss	1963-1964
2	Essa Smairat	1965-1967
3	Fareed Akroush	1968-1971
4	Yousuf Daoud	1972-1980
5	Adolfo Sweiss	1980-1984
6	Kamal Daoud	1985-1987
7	Farouq Jraisat	1988-1992
8	Jamal Hattar	1992-1994
9	Anton Dayyat	1995-1999
10	Hweishel Akroush	1999-2003
11	Fuad Smairat	2003-2007
12	Jeries Sweiss	2007-2010
13	Hweishel Akroush	2013-2017
14	Jamal Hattar	2017-2021
15	Omar Akroush	2022–2025

== See also ==
- Greek Orthodox Patriarchate of Jerusalem
- Latin Patriarchate of Jerusalem
- Jordanian Christians

== Bibliography ==
- Government of Jordan, Department of Statistics (1964). First Census of Population and Housing. Volume I: Final Tables; General Characteristics of the Population (PDF).
- "The Population of the Kingdom by Administrative Divisions, According to the General Census of Population and Housing result 2015" (PDF). Department of Statistics, Jordan.
- "Estimated Population of the Kingdom by Municipality and Sex, at End-year 2018" (PDF). Department of Statistics, Jordan. Archived from the original (PDF) on 2021-04-12.
- Robinson, E.; Smith, E. (1841). Biblical Researches in Palestine, Mount Sinai and Arabia Petraea: A Journal of Travels in the year 1838. Vol. 3. Boston: Crocker & Brewster.
