= Jean Assaad Haddad =

Lebanese Catholic priest (1926–2021)

- Archeparch of Tyre
- Native name: جان أسعد حداد
- Church: Melkite Greek Catholic Church
- Archdiocese: Archeparchy of Tyre
- In office: 26 October 1988 – 20 June 2005
- Predecessor: Georges Haddad
- Successor: Georges Bacouni

Orders
- Ordination: 2 July 1950
- Consecration: 27 November 1988 by Maximos V Hakim

Personal details
- Born: 17 December 1926 Beit Chabab, mandatory Lebanese Republic, French Empire
- Died: 22 January 2021 (aged 94)

Jean Assaad Haddad (17 December 1926 – 22 January 2021) was a Lebanese Melkite hierarch, who served as an archbishop of the Melkite Greek Catholic Archeparchy of Tyre in Lebanon.

== Life ==
Haddad was born in December 1926 in Beit Chabab, Lebanon. On 2 July 1950, he received his priestly ordination. On 26 October 1988 he became successor to Archbishop Georges Haddad as Archbishop of Tyre. The Patriarch of Antioch Maximos V Hakim consecrated him bishop on 27 November 1988, and his co-consecrators were the Archbishops Grégoire Haddad as Titular Archbishop of Adana of Greek Melkites and Habib Bacha, SMSP of Beirut and Byblos.

In 2000, Haddad from 6 June to 29 November became apostolic administrator "sede plena" of the Melkite Patriarchate of Antioch. On 20 June 2005 he became emeritus bishop due to age-related reasons, and was succeeded by Georges Bacouni, whom he co-consecrated. He also served as co-consecrator of the Archbishops Boutros Mouallem, MSP of São Paulo in Brazil and Joseph Kallas of Beirut and Byblos.
