= George Riashi =

George Riashi B.C.
- Archeparch of Tripoli
- Native name: چورچ رياشى
- Church: Melkite Greek Catholic Church
- Archdiocese: Archeparchy of Tripoli
- In office: 28 July 1995 – 3 March 2010
- Predecessor: Elias Nijmé
- Successor: Eduard Daher
- Previous post: Eparch of Saint Michael Archangel in Sydney (1987-1995)

Orders
- Ordination: 4 April 1965 by Philippe Nabaa
- Consecration: 19 July 1987 by Maximos V Hakim

Personal details
- Born: 25 November 1933 Qâa er Rîm, mandatory Lebanese Republic, French Empire
- Died: 28 October 2012 (aged 78)

George Riashi (25 November 1933, Qâa er Rîm – 28 October 2012) was the Greek Melkite Catholic bishop of Melkite Greek Catholic Archeparchy of Tripoli and all North Lebanon.

== Life ==
George Riashi was one of nine children of Khattar and Zahia Riashi. Until 1948 he attended the local school and then moved to the Saint John's Basilian Seminary. Until 1953, he remained in the Basilian seminary and made his temporal vows. His religious name was Athanasius, according to Athanasius of Alexandria. Riashi started his religious studies to become a priest in 1955 in the Basilian Chouerite Order's Mar Yohanna Seminary in Khenchara and later in Saint Joseph University in Beirut in the American University of Beirut. From 1958 to 1965 Riashi studied philosophy, theology, computer science and mathematics. In 1962 he became a subdeacon and 1963 was ordained deacon. Riashi was ordained to the priesthood on 4 April 1965, but took off his name Athanasius and bore the name of George, being a member of the Basilian Chouerite Order. In France he continued his studies, receiving a scholarship at the Institut Catholique de Paris. Then Riashi went back to Lebanon and taught for the next five years at the Basilian Saint John Seminary. At the same time he devoted himself to work in the Scout movement and was the Chaplain-General of them in Lebanon. and until 1969 was the head of Choueriot Seminary. He was appointed principal of Saint Antoine Secondary School in Kfarshima, Lebanon for a year, before serving in the United States from 1970 until 1987. On 1 December 1971 Riachi came to Detroit sent and supported there by Archimandrite Agabios in his office. He took over in 1978 pastoral work to Melkites in Detroit and was named Archimandrite on 21 July 1981 by Patriarch Maximos V Hakim.

== Episcopal dignity ==
In 1987, he was elected by the Holy Synod of the Melkite Church as first Bishop of the Melkite Greek Catholic Eparchy of Saint Michael Archangel in Sydney. The Patriarch of Antioch Maximos V Hakim was his consecrator and his co-consecrators were Archbishop Joseph Tawil of Newton and Archbishop Jean Mansour, SMSP, Auxiliary Bishop of Antioch, and his episcopal ordination was performed on 19 July 1987. In 1995 the Melkite Synod elected him Bishop of Tripoli and all the North. In this office, Riashi was a participant in the Special Assembly of the Synod of Bishops (Catholic) on the Middle East. In 2010 the Melkite Synod accepted his age-related withdrawal.

== Death ==
On 28 October 2012, Riashi rested in the Lord.
