= Catholic Diocese of Acre =

Diocese of Acre may refer to either of two Catholic diocesan jurisdictions with seat in the city of Acre, Israel:

- Latin Catholic Diocese of Acre
- Melkite Greek Catholic Archeparchy of Akka
