= Youssef Matta =

Melkite Greek Catholic bishop (born 1968)

- Archbishop of Akka, Haifa, Nazareth and All Galilee
- Church: Melkite Greek Catholic Church
- Archdiocese: Akka (Greek-Melkite)
- Appointed: 18 March 2019

Orders
- Ordination: 19 June 1999
- Consecration: 1 June 2019

Personal details
- Born: 3 December 1968 (age 57) Nazareth, Israel

Youssef Abedallah Matta (born 3 December 1968) is an Israeli Melkite Greek Catholic archbishop, serving as the Archbishop of Akka, Haifa, Nazareth and All Galilee since 2019. He was elected by the Synod of Bishops of the Melkite Greek Catholic Church and his election was confirmed by Pope Francis.

== Early life and education ==
Youssef Matta was born on 3 December 1968 in Nazareth, Israel. He studied computer science at the Technion University of Haifa from 1991 to 1992, and subsequently undertook his seminary formation at the Latin diocesan seminary in Beit Jala from 1992 until 1998.

== Priestly ministry ==
Matta was ordained a priest for the Melkite Greek Catholic Archeparchy of Akka on 19 June 1999. From 1990 to 2003 he served as private secretary to Pierre Mouallem, S.M.S.P. He later pursued advanced studies at the Pontifical Oriental Institute in Rome, earning a doctorate in Eastern canon law between 2004 and 2007.

He also served as private secretary to Elias Chacour from 2008 to 2009, and was a formator at the Greek Melkite Seminary of Saint Anne in Raboueh, Lebanon, from 2009 to 2011. He was parish priest of Saint George in I'billin from 2011 until 2013, after which he served as coadjutor of the parish of the Annunciation in Nazareth.

== Episcopacy ==
The Synod of Bishops of the Melkite Greek Catholic Church elected Matta as Archbishop of Akka at a meeting in Raboueh, Lebanon from 5 to 9 November 2018. Pope Francis gave his assent to the election on 18 March 2019.

He was consecrated a bishop on 1 June 2019, and later installed in his role as Archbishop of Akka, Haifa, Nazareth and All Galilee.
