= Georges Bacouni =

Greek Catholic Archbishop

The Most Reverend Georges Bacouni
- Archbishop of Beirut-Gibail
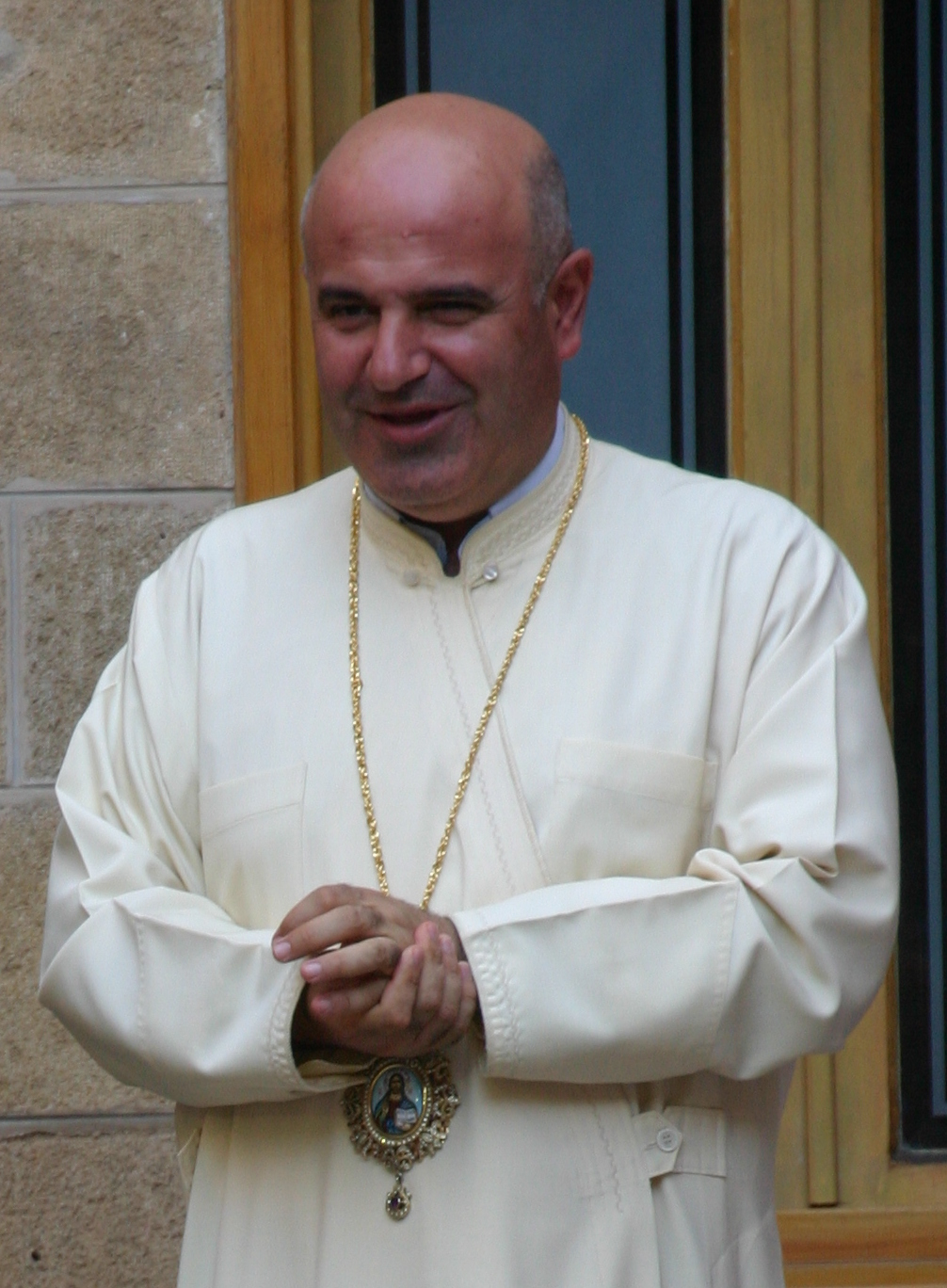
- Bacouni on 18 September 2012.
- Church: Melkite Greek Catholic
- Archdiocese: Beirut-Gibail
- See: Beirut-Gibail
- Elected: 9 November 2018
- Predecessor: Cyril Salim Bustros

Orders
- Ordination: 30 July 1995 by Habib Bacha
- Consecration: 27 November 2005 by Grégoire III Laham

Personal details
- Born: Georges Bacouni; 16 May 1962 (age 63) Aïn el-Roummaneh, Lebanon

Georges Bacouni (also Bakhouni or Bakouny; born 16 May 1962) is a Lebanese Melkite Catholic hierarch, who has served as Archbishop of Beirut and Byblos since 2018.

== Ministry ==
Bacouni attended the Saint Paul Institute in Harissa, from where he obtained a license in philosophy and theology, and the Lebanese University, where he earned a degree in Business Administration and Accountancy.

Bacouni was consecrated by Archbishop Habib Bacha, SMSP, of Beirut and Byblos on 30 July 1995 as diocesan priest. He subsequently held several positions at Bikfaya, Ballouneh, and Safra parish.

In 1998, he was admitted to the clerical patriarchate management in Rabieh and served as general supervisor to the Beirut bishopric. He became a member of the mission committee and coordinator for the youth diocese committee.

On 22 June 2005 he was elected to be the successor to Jean Assaad Haddad as Archbishop at the Melkite Greek Catholic Archeparchy of Tyre and after connfirmation ordanined on 27 November of that year by the Patriarch of Antioch Gregory III Laham, BS. His co-consecrators were his predecessor Haddad and Archbishop Joseph Kallas of Beirut and Byblos SMSP.

On 21 June 2014 he was named by Patriarch Gregory III Laham to be the Melkite Synod Archbishop of the Melkite Greek Catholic Archeparchy of Akka and installed in that office on August 5.

On 8 November 2018, he was elected as the Archbishop of Beirut and Byblos (Jbeil) and confirmed on the 24th of that month. However, it is not clear whether he has been installed yet.

Pope Francis named him a member of the Congregation for the Oriental Churches on 6 August 2019.

== Views ==
=== Opinion about lack of priests and celibacy ===
In an interview on the issue of the shortage of priests and celibacy, Bacaouni expressed his surprise at the Latin Church, which had drawn from the experience of the Eastern Churches with married priests. His key message was: "Christianity survived in the Middle East because of married priests". On the situation in his diocese, he said that in his 10 parishes 12 priests are active, including eight married priests and four unmarried priests. His conclusion was that celibacy for priests in the Latin Church was always not defined as church discipline and theological or spiritual issue. Finally, the exemplary life of married or celibate priests in their communities, the knowledge of theology, preaching the gospel and the celebration of the sacraments became most important to him.

=== On the situation of Christians in Lebanon ===
In a conversation with "Asianews" Bacouni said as the archbishop of Tyre, that Christians have become a minority in their own country. Since 1970, he noted, had become steadily less the percentage of Christians in the Lebanese population. This has the effect that the pressure of the Muslims would lead to a permanent emigration among Christians. "They (the Christians) feel an ever increasing alienation to their own country," said Archbishop Bacouni. He therefore called on the Church "by a credible life according to the Gospels and the proclamation of the Word of God, to encourage the Christians."

=== Middle East ===
As a delegate to the Special Assembly of the Synod of Bishops for the Middle East in October 2010, he commented in the final bulletin. He stressed that the problems of Christians in Jordan describe a difficult new situation. But, he stresses, we must be able to keep the young people in their home countries. And in order to achieve this, the clergy and the episcopate must make a massive effort.
