= Archdiocese of Beirut =

Archdiocese of Beirut or Archeparchy of Beirut may refer to:

- Greek Orthodox Archdiocese of Beirut, an Eastern Orthodox archdiocese, centered in Beirut
- Syriac Orthodox Archdiocese of Beirut, an Oriental Orthodox archdiocese, centered in Beirut
- Armenian Catholic Archdiocese of Beirut, an Armenian Catholic archdiocese, centered in Beirut
- Melkite Greek Catholic Archeparchy of Beirut and Byblos, a Greek Catholic archdiocese, centered in Beirut
- Maronite Catholic Archdiocese of Beirut, a Maronite Catholic archdiocese, centered in Beirut

== See also ==
- Archbishop of Beirut (disambiguation)
- Diocese of Beirut (disambiguation)
- Christianity in Lebanon
