= Archbishop of Beirut =

Archbishop of Beirut may refer to:

- Greek Orthodox Archbishop of Beirut, an Eastern Orthodox archbishop, seated in Beirut
- Syriac Orthodox Archbishop of Beirut, an Oriental Orthodox archbishop, seated in Beirut
- Greek Catholic Archbishop of Beirut, a Greek Catholic archbishop, seated in Beirut
- Maronite Catholic Archbishop of Beirut, a Maronite Catholic archbishop, seated in Beirut

== See also ==
- Archdiocese of Beirut (disambiguation)
- Diocese of Beirut (disambiguation)
- Christianity in Lebanon
