= Georges Haddad =

- Archeparch of Tyre
- Native name: جورج حداد
- Church: Melkite Greek Catholic Church
- Archdiocese: Archeparchy of Tyre
- In office: 30 July 1965 – 30 December 1985
- Predecessor: Agapios Salomon Naoum
- Successor: Jean Assaad Haddad

Orders
- Ordination: 26 June 1948
- Consecration: 5 September 1965 by Maximos IV Sayegh

Personal details
- Born: 14 March 1924 Beit Chabab, mandatory, State of Greater Lebanon, French Empire
- Died: 30 December 1985 (aged 61)

Georges Haddad (14 March 1924, in Beit Chabad, Lebanon – 30 December 1985) was Archbishop of the Melkite Greek Catholic Archeparchy of Tyre in Lebanon.

== Priest ==
Having entered the Seminary of Saint Anne in Rabweh in 1935, he finished his studies there and was ordained to the priesthood at the Melkite diocese in Beirut on 26 June 1948. Subsequently, Haddad filled a teaching post, became secretary at the Archbishopric of Beirut and pastor at the parish of Saint John Chrysostom.

== Archbishop ==
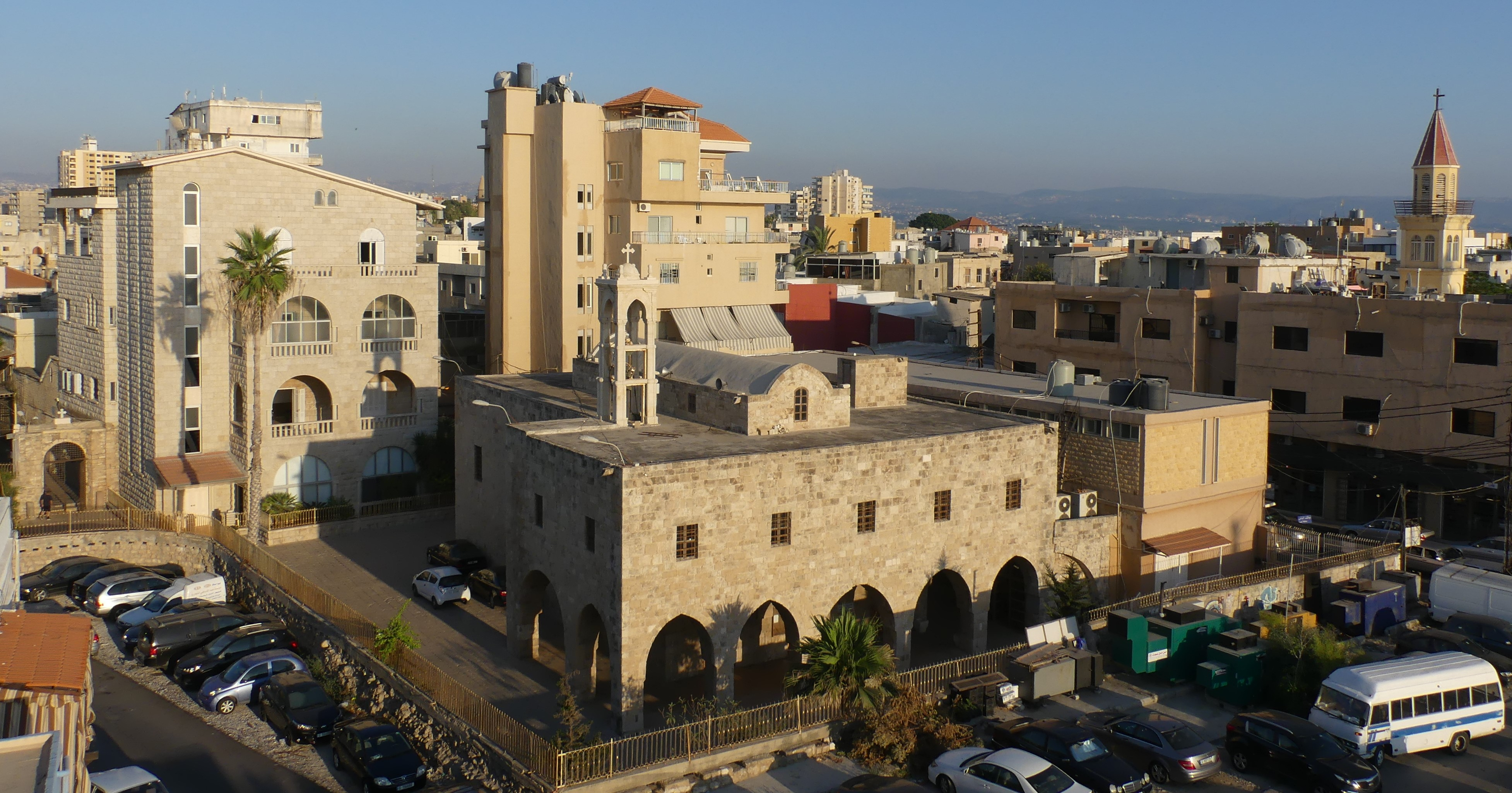
The Cathedral of Saint Thomas in Tyre with the seat of the archeparchy on the left hand side and the Catholic-Latin church of the Couvent de Terre Sainte on the right hand side

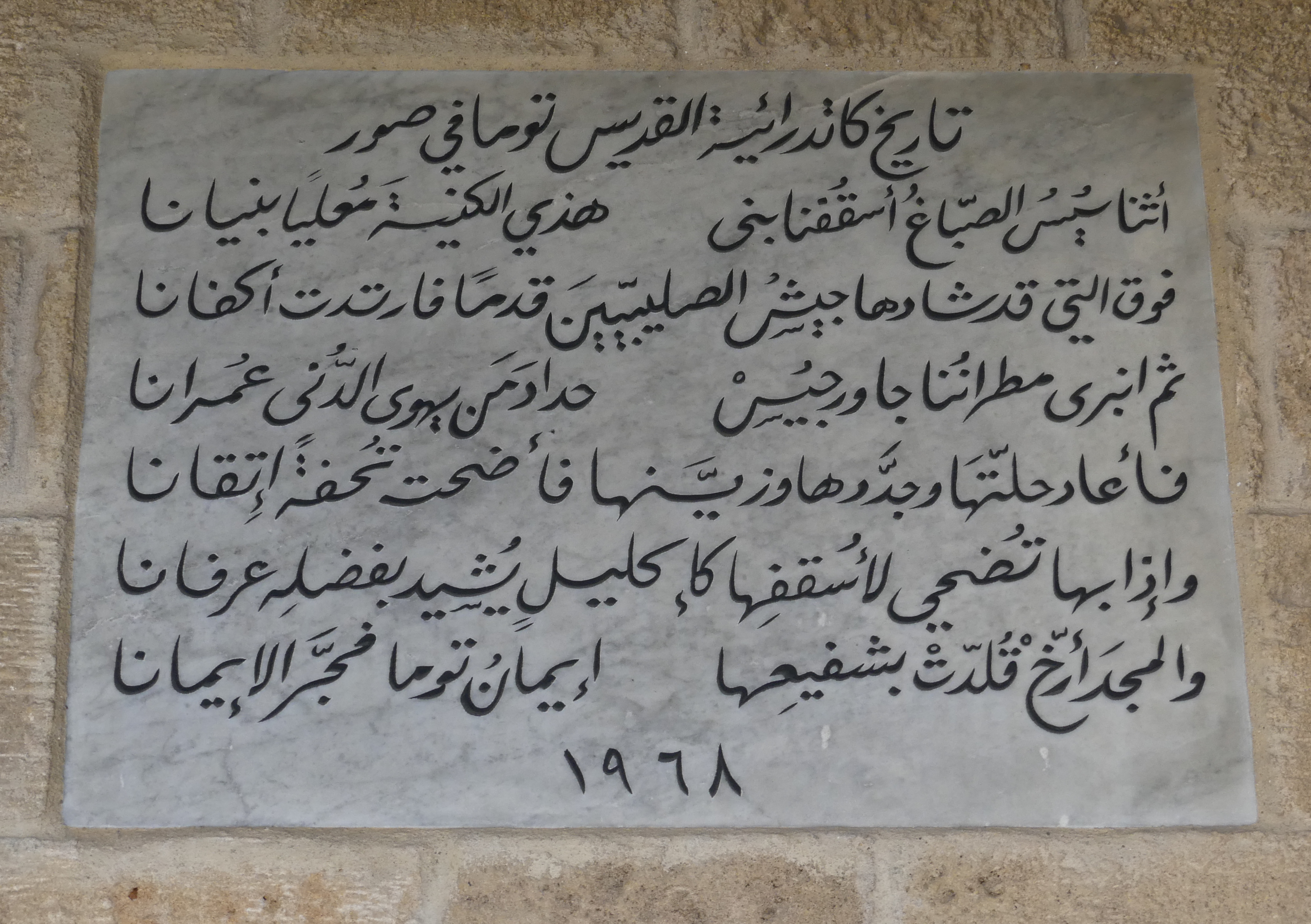
1968 plaque in the facade of St. Thomas commemorating the efforts of Haddad

On 30 July 1965, Haddad was appointed as Archbishop of Tyre, succeeding Archbishop Agapios Salomon Naoum. The Patriarch of Antioch Maximos IV Sayegh ordained him to this office, assisted by the co-consecrators Archbishop Basile Khoury of Sidon in Lebanon and Archbishop Mikhayl Assaf of Petra and Philadelphia in Amman, Jordan. At the end of the same year, Haddad participated as a council father in the last session of the Second Vatican Council.

In the ten years before the outbreak of the Lebanese Civil War (1975–1990), Haddad had a new seat of the archeparchy constructed and the historical Cathedral of Saint Thomas repaired. At the same time, he developed close relations with the Shia leader Sayyed Musa Sadr.

When Israel's invasion of Lebanon started on 6 June 1982, Haddad reportedly succeeded in temporarily halting the attack of an Israeli Defense Forces (IDF) tank column in a bold appeal to its commander, mediated by a Swiss delegate of the International Committee of the Red Cross (ICRC), to evacuate the civilian population to the beaches. Hence, he was widely praised as

"a model ecumenical pastor, maintaining cordial human relations with all, and especially with the most needy, without any discrimination whatsoever."

During his tenure, Haddad was co-consecrator of:

- Archbishop Boutros Raï, auxiliary bishop in Antioch and Titular Archbishop of Edessa in Osrhoene of Greek Melkites,
- Archbishop Maximos Salloum of Acre,
- Bishop Michel Hakim of Sidon,
- Bishop Spiridon Mattar of São Paulo.

"He died 30th December 1985, after a long and painful illness which had come upon him suddenly and which he bore with loving resignation to the will of the lord."

His successor became Jean Assaad Haddad.
