= Melkite Greek Catholic Archeparchy of Akka =

Melkite Greek Catholic archeparchy in Israel

Coordinates: 32.8192°N 34.9946°E

Archeparchy of Akka (Melkite Greek) Archieparchia Ptolemaidensis Melchitarum أبرشية عكا وحيفا والناصرة وسائر الجليل للروم الملكيين الكاثوليك
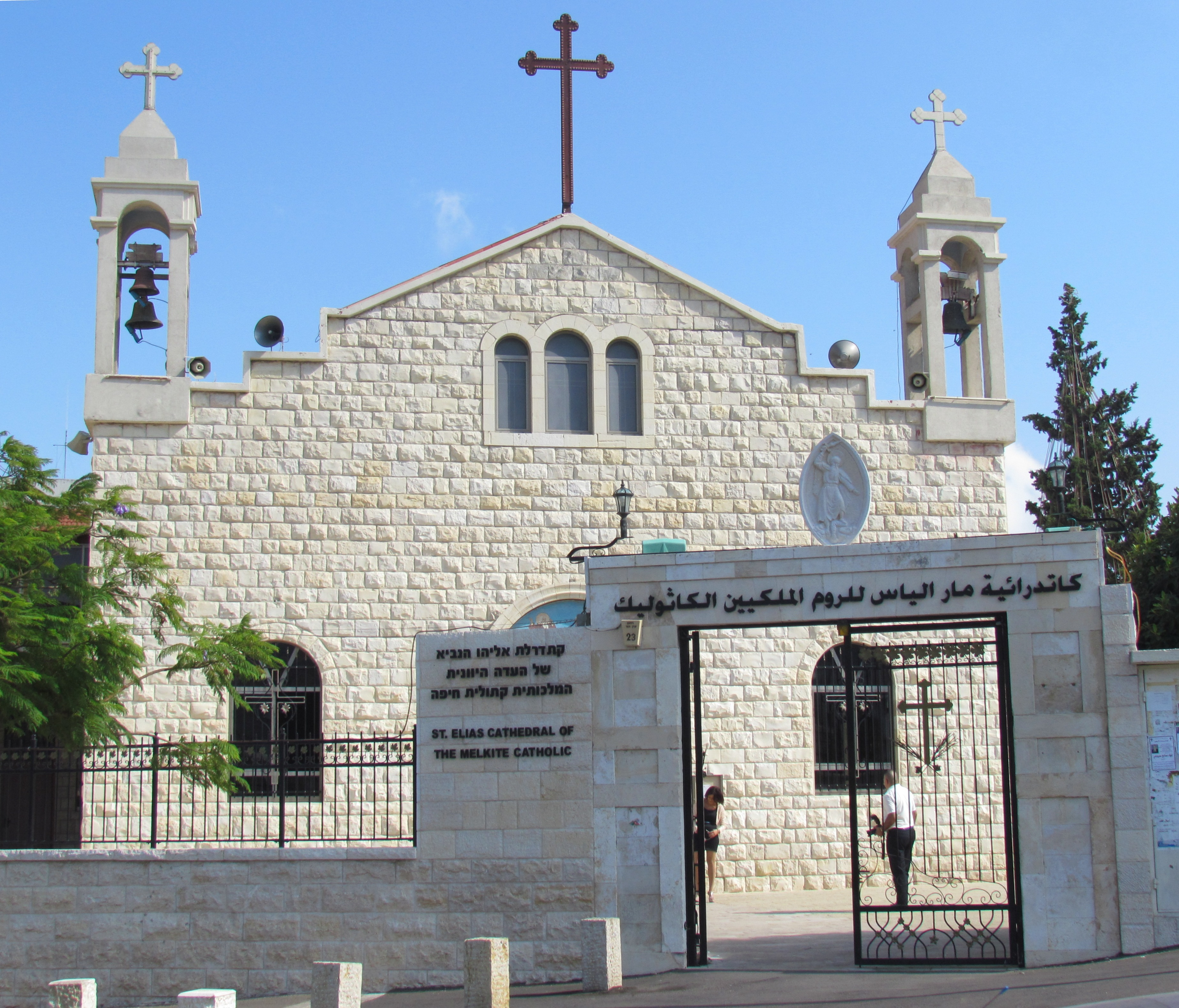
- St. Elijah Cathedral

Location
- Country: Israel
- Headquarters: Syria

Statistics
- Population: (as of 2022); 73,921
- Parishes: 37

Information
- Denomination: Melkite Greek Catholic Church
- Rite: Byzantine Rite
- Established: 1753
- Cathedral: Saint Elias Cathedral

Current leadership
- Pope: Leo XIV
- Patriarch: Youssef Absi
- Archeparch: Youssef Matta
- Bishops emeritus: Pierre Mouallem; Elias Chacour

Website
- https://logosofgalilee.com/

Melkite Greek Catholic Archeparchy of Akka (Arabic: أبرشية عكا وحيفا والناصرة وسائر الجليل للروم الملكيين الكاثوليك) is a diocese of the Melkite Greek Catholic Church (Byzantine Rite, Arabic), directly subject to the Melkite Catholic Patriarchate of Antioch. Its cathedral episcopal see is St. Elijah Greek-Melkite Cathedral, in Haifa.

== Territory and statistics ==
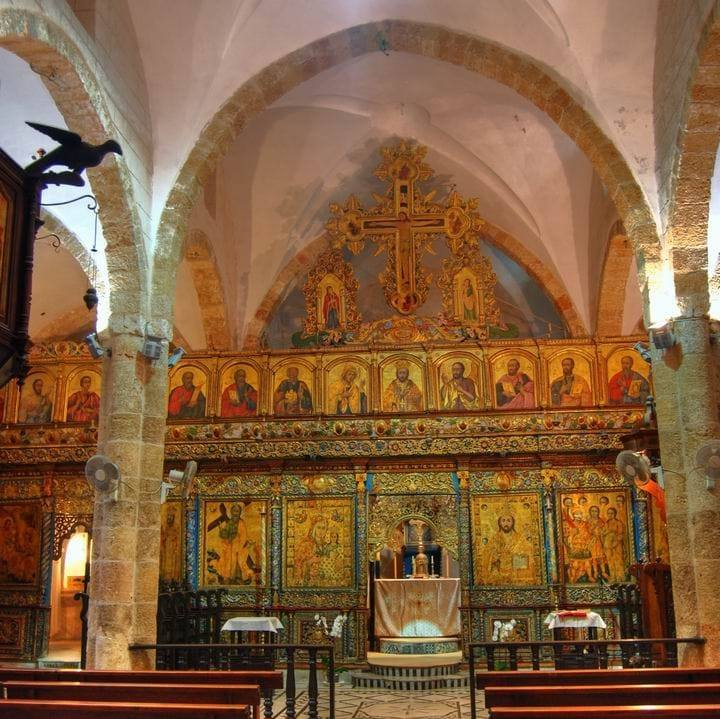
Church of Saint Andrew, Acre.

The archeparchy extends its jurisdiction to Melkites of Israel, especially of Galilee. The headquarters of the archeparchy (archdiocese) is Haifa, where the Saint Elias Cathedral is located. The Melkite Greek Catholic Archeparchy of Akka counted 73,921 baptised members, and had a territory subdivided into thirty-seven parishes in 2022.

As of 2014 the Melkite Greek Catholic Church was the largest Christian community in Israel, with roughly 60 per cent of Israeli Christians belonging to the Melkite Greek Catholic Church.

The city of Haifa has the largest Melkite Greek Catholic community in Israel, followed by the cities of Nazareth and Shefa-Amr. Melkite Greek Catholic communities exist in a number of other towns in Galilee, either as the sole religious community or amongst other communities of Muslims, Druze and other Christians, including in:

- Abu Snan
- Arraba
- Bi'ina
- Daliyat al-Karmel
- Deir Hanna
- Eilabun
- Hurfeish
- I'billin
- Isfiya
- Jadeidi-Makr
- Jish
- Kafr Kanna
- Kafr Yasif
- Kisra-Sumei
- Maghar
- Mazra'a
- Muqeible
- Peki'in
- Rameh
- Ras al-Ein
- Reineh
- Sakhnin
- Shefa-Amr
- Tur'an
- Yafa an-Naseriyye

They also have a presence in other mixed cities, especially Jerusalem and Tel Aviv-Jaffa, Ramleh, Lod, Acre, Nof HaGalil, and Ma'alot Tarshiha. It is reported that all the inhabitants of Fassuta and Mi'ilya are Melkite Christians.

== History ==
Ancient Ptolemais-Acre was visited by Paul of Tarsus during his trip described in chapter 21 of the Acts of Apostles. Soon, the city was a strong Christian community. In the third century was established headquarters of an ancient episcopal see here and the capital of the bishop of the diocese, which is suffragan of the Melkite Greek Catholic Archeparchy of Tyre, referring to the ancient period in Ptolemais in Phoenicia, called Acre in the Crusader period.

In 1753, the see was restored as a Melkite diocese by Patriarch Cyril VI Tanas and attached once again to Tyre, which had become independent from Jerusalem. However, the Melkite bishops of Acre began to reside there only in 1804.

Before 1932, the jurisdiction of Acre included Transjordan. The see became an Archeparchy on 18 November 1964 with the Papal Bull Apostolic constitution of Pope Paul VI and includes all Galilee.

== List of episcopal ordinaries ==
=== Eparchs of Akka ===
The following were Melkite Greek Catholic eparchs (bishops) of Akka:

- Macaire Ajemi, 1759 – 25 December 1774 (resigned)
- Michel (Germanos) Adam, consecrated 25 December 1774 – July 1777, then appointed Archeparch of Aleppo)
- Makarios Fakhoury, after July 1777 (uncertain) –1794
- Makarios Nahas (1795 – c. 1809)
- Habib Theodosius (1809 – c. 1833)
- Michel Clement Bahouth BS, consecrated 10 August 1836, served until 16 June 1856, when confirmed as Patriarch of Antioch
- Hanna (Gregory) Youssef-Sayour, consecrated 13 November 1856, until 27 March 1865 when confirmed as Patriarch of Antioch
- Agapio Dumani BS, 4 December 1864–1893 (deceased)
- Athanase Sabbagh, 18 April 1894 – 2 June 1899 (deceased)
- Grégoire Haggiar, 24 March 1901 – 30 October 1940 (deceased)
  - Joseph Malouf (apostolic administrator), 1940–1943

=== Archeparchs of Akka ===
A list of Melkite Greek Catholic archeparchs (archbishops) of Akka is shown below:

- Georges Hakim, 13 March 1943 – 26 November 1967, later Patriarch of Antioch of the Greek-Melkites (Syria)
- Joseph-Marie Raya, 9 September 1968 – 21 August 1974 (resigned), then Titular Archbishop of Scythopolis, 21 August 1974 – 10 June 2005
- Maximos Salloum, 20 August 1975 – 23 July 1997 (withdrawn)
  - Lutfi Laham (apostolic administrator), 1997–1998
- Pierre Mouallem SMSP, 29 July 1998 – 18 July 2003 (withdrawn) (Note: Previously (1975–1987) the Superior General of Society of Missionaries of Saint Paul; and eparch (bishop) of Nossa Senhora do Paraíso em São Paulo (Brazil), 20 April 1990 – 29 July 1998)
  - Georges Nicholas Haddad (apostolic administrator), 21 March 2003 – 10 December 2005 (Note: Simultaneously apostolic exarch of Argentina (20 April 2002 – 19 December 2005), Titular Bishop of Myra (20 April 2002 – 14 October 2006); later Archeparch of Baniyas (Lebanon), from 14 October 2006)
- Elias Chacour, 7 February 2006 – 27 January 2014 (withdrawn)
  - Moussa El-Hage, OAM (apostolic administrator), (27 January 2014 – 21 June 2014) (Note: Simultaneously Maronite archeparch of Haifa and Holy Land and Maronite patriarchal exarch of Jerusalem and Palestine and Jordan, since 16 June 2012)
- George Bacouni, 21 June 2014 – 9 November 2018 (Note: Formerly Metropolitan Archeparch of Tyre (Lebanon), [27 June 2005] 20 October 2005 – 21 June 2014), later metropolitan archbishop of Beirut and Byblos (since 9 November 2018))
  - Fr. Andraus Bahus (apostolic administrator), (24 November 2018 – March 2019)
- Youssef Matta (since 18 March 2019)

== See also ==
- Catholic Church in Israel
- Latin Catholic Diocese of Acre
- Maronite Catholic Archeparchy of Haifa and the Holy Land

== Sources and external links ==
- GigaCatholic, with incumbent biography links
