= St. Elias Cathedral, Beirut =

Cathedral in downtown Beirut, Lebanon

Saint Elias Greek Catholic Cathedral
- Location within Beirut Location within Lebanon

Religion
- Affiliation: Melkite Greek Catholic Church
- Year consecrated: 1849
- Status: active

Location
- Location: Beirut, Lebanon
- Coordinates: 33.896703°N 35.505373°E

Architecture
- Style: Byzantine style
- Completed: 1849

Saint Elias Greek Catholic Cathedral is a Melkite Greek Catholic cathedral located in downtown Beirut, Lebanon, dedicated to Saint Elias, completely restored after the Lebanese Civil War (1975–1990) on previous constructions dating to a Choueirite convent from the 19th century. Its plan followed the Byzantine style.

== History ==
A convent of Choueirite monks and a church dedicated to Saint Elias once stood on this site. They were both built towards the end of the 18th century, following the split in the Beirut Melchite community into Orthodox and Catholic churches.

In danger of collapse, this complex was reconstructed between 1847 and 1849 under Bishop Agapios Riachi, producing the present three-nave cathedral. Its plan followed the Byzantine style, while the interior combined both baroque and Islamic features. During the first half of the 20th century, the exterior of the cathedral was restored twice, first in 1901, then between 1940 and 1950. The construction in the 1930s of the Assicurazioni Generali building blocked the view of the cathedral from Etoile Square.

Severely damaged during the Lebanese Civil War (1975–1990), the cathedral has been completely restored. The renovation reopened its main entrance on the west side, and replaced the former living quarters of the bishop with a bell tower and a reception hall. A colonnaded open courtyard – peristyle – of a Roman public building was uncovered during the works.

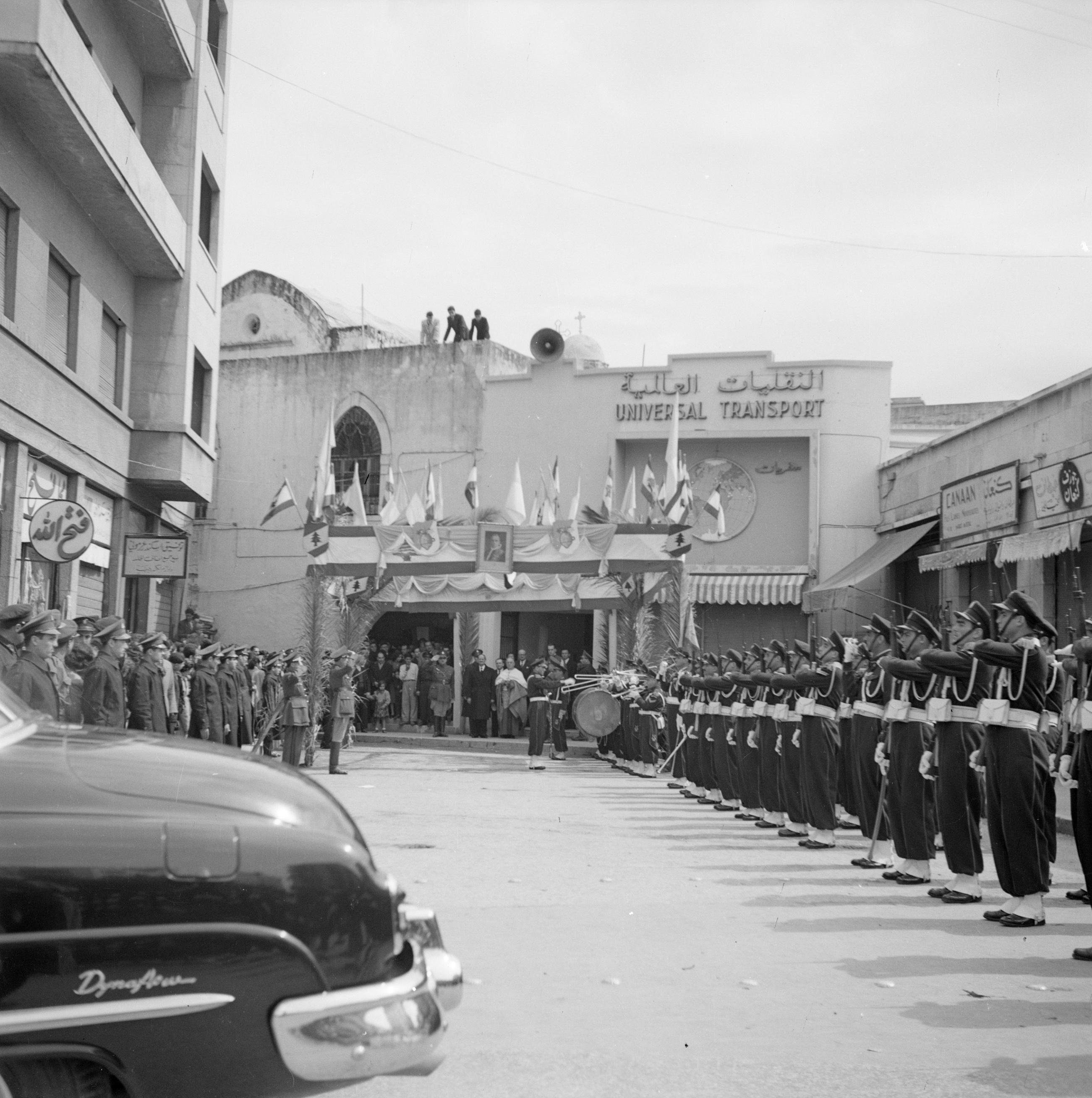
Entrance to the Cathedral in 1950

== See also ==
- Melkite Greek Catholic Archeparchy of Beirut and Byblos

== Sources ==
- Les lieux de culte au Liban. Ministère du Tourisme, Beyrouth
- Information provided by the Archbishop's palace in Beirut
