= Agapios Salomon Naoum =

Agapios Salomon Naoum BS
- Archeparch of Tyre
- Native name: اجابيوس سالومون نعوم
- Church: Melkite Greek Catholic Church
- Archdiocese: Archeparchy of Tyre
- In office: 3 December 1933 – 15 October 1965
- Predecessor: Massimo Sayegh
- Successor: Georges Haddad
- Other post: Titular Archeparch of Tarsus (dei Greco-Melkiti) (1965-1967)

Orders
- Ordination: 8 September 1907
- Consecration: 3 December 1933 by Cyril IX Moghabghab

Personal details
- Born: 1 August 1882 Deir al-Qamar, Mount Lebanon Mutasarrifate, Ottoman Empire
- Died: 1 May 1967 (aged 84)

Agapios Salomon Naoum, BS (1 August 1882 – 1 May 1967) was Archbishop of the Melkite Greek Catholic Archeparchy of Tyre in Lebanon.

== Life ==
Agapios Naoum was ordained on 8 September 1907 Chaplain of the Melkite Basilian of the Most Holy Redeemer. On 3 November 1933, he was appointed as successor to Archbishop Maximos IV Sayegh to the see of Tyre and on 3 December 1933, by Patriarch Cyril IX Moghabghab was ordained bishop. On 15 October 1965 he resigned his duties as archeparch and with simultaneous appointment as Titular Archbishop of Tarsus of Greek Melkites he became Professor Emeritus until his death on 1 May 1967. Naoum was succeeded by Archbishop Georges Haddad.
