= Church of Saint Andrew, Acre =

Church building in Acre, Israel

Coordinates: 32.9206°N 35.0672°E

St. Andrew's Church
- כנסיית אנדראס הקדוש
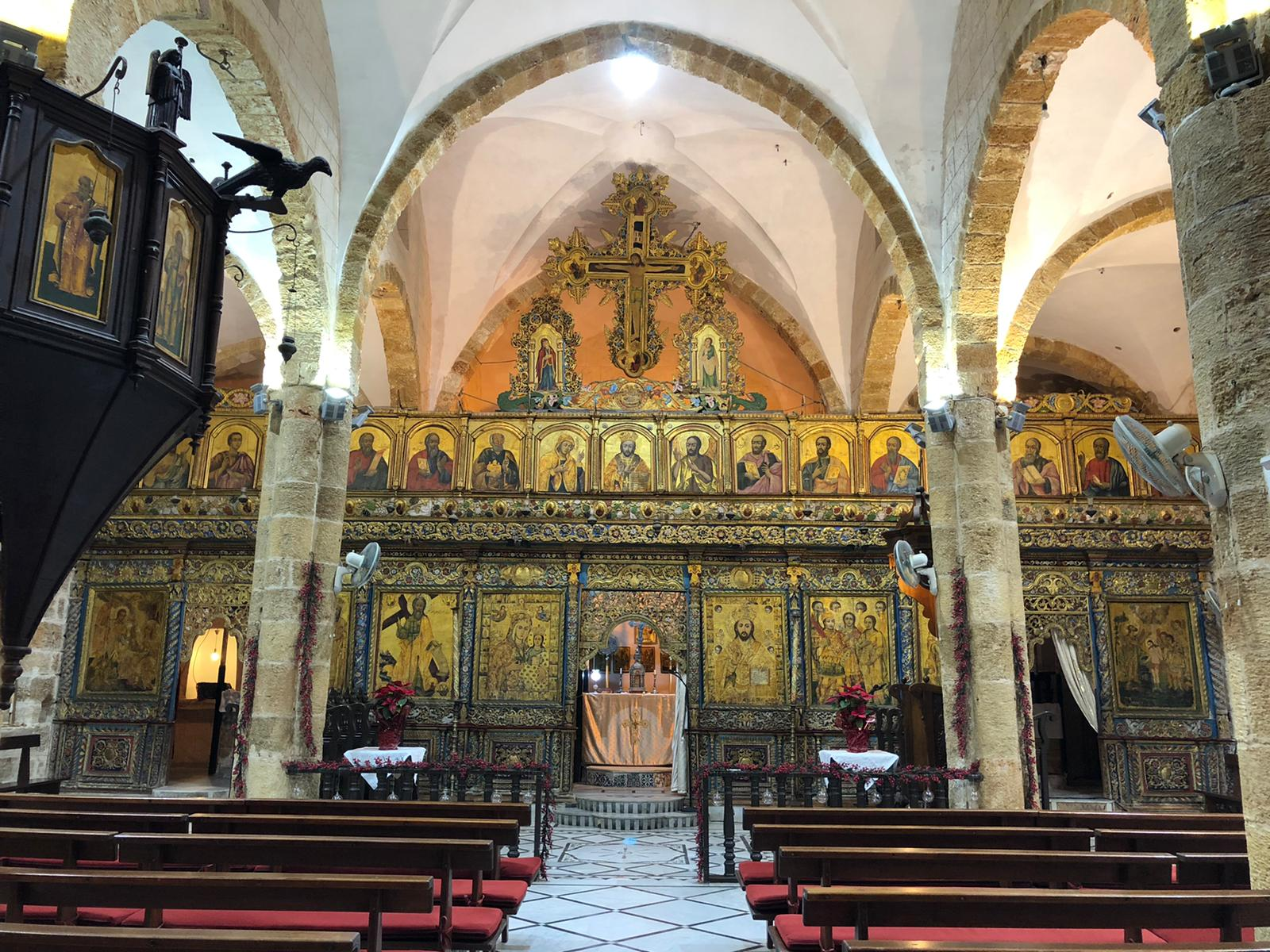
- Interior of the church (present day)
- St. Andrew's Church
- Location: Acre
- Country: Israel
- Denomination: Catholic (Greek-Catholic Eastern Rite)

St Andrew's Church is a Melkite Greek Catholic church. Built in 1765, it is located in the old city of Acre, at Philippe Auguste street, north of the Templars tunnel in modern-day Israel. It is named after one of the twelve apostles of Jesus. The church was built on the remains of a Crusader church. The church is still used today and is known for its beautiful interior, icons, and ornate decoration.

== History ==
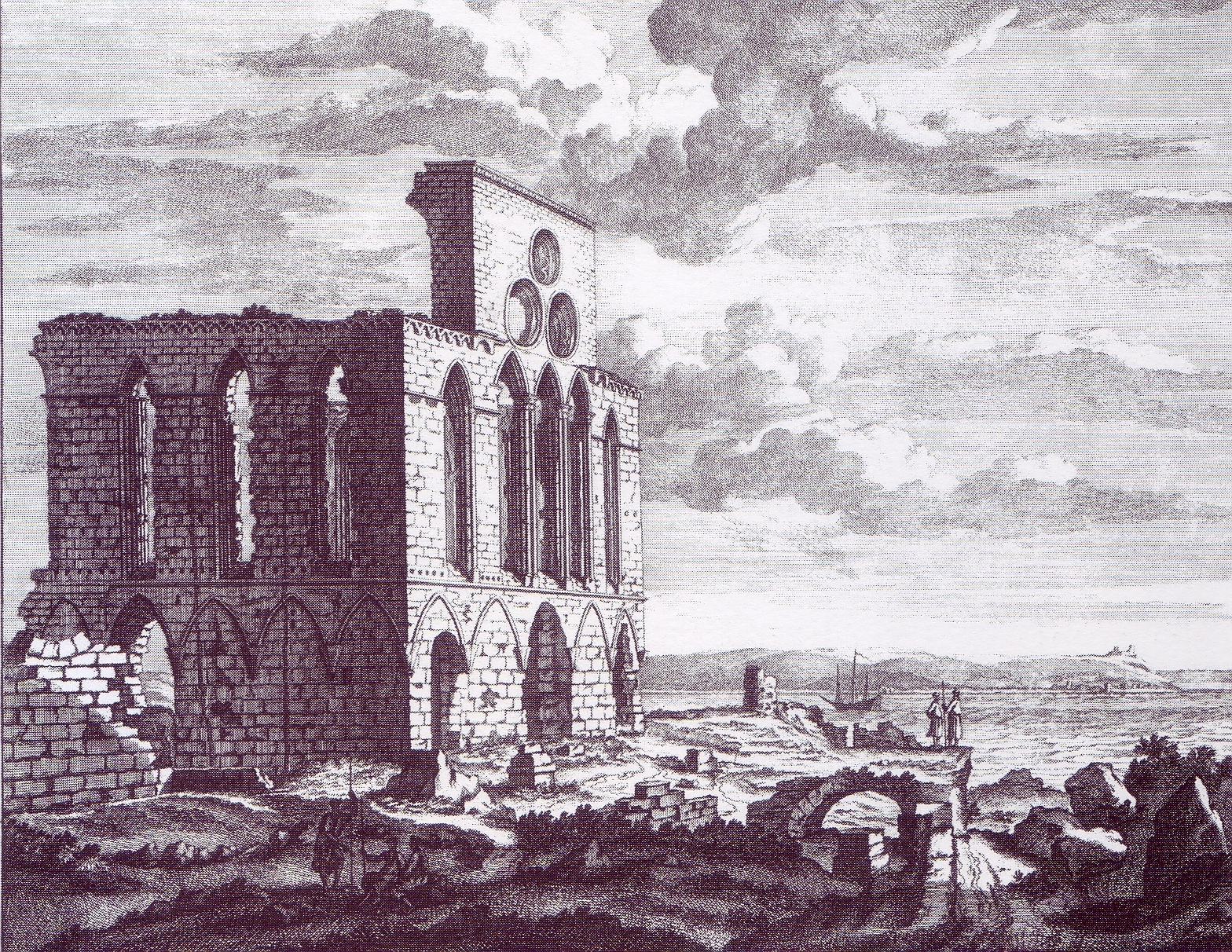
1682 sketch showing the ruins of the 13th century church

St. Andrew's Church (Hebrew: כנסיית אנדראס הקדוש Latin: Ecclesia Sancti Andreae) was built in 1765 on the ruins of the Crusader church that was destroyed in 1291. It belongs to the Catholic Church and follows the Greek-Catholic Eastern Rite in full communion with the Pope in Rome. Thanks to its location overlooking the Mediterranean, the church was easily visible for the Crusaders.

The Crusaders of the Templars order settled in Acre in the 12th century, after the fall of Jerusalem, and built a fortress on the south-west corner of the old city of Acre. Adjacent to their palace (Templum) they built the Church of Santa Anna, named after the Mother of the Virgin Mary. The 12th-century church was rebuilt and enlarged in the 13th century as a grand Gothic Cathedral. The structure of the two-story Crusader church survived and stone of the original church was used in the construction of the current building. The top floor of the original Crusader church remains and is still in ruins.

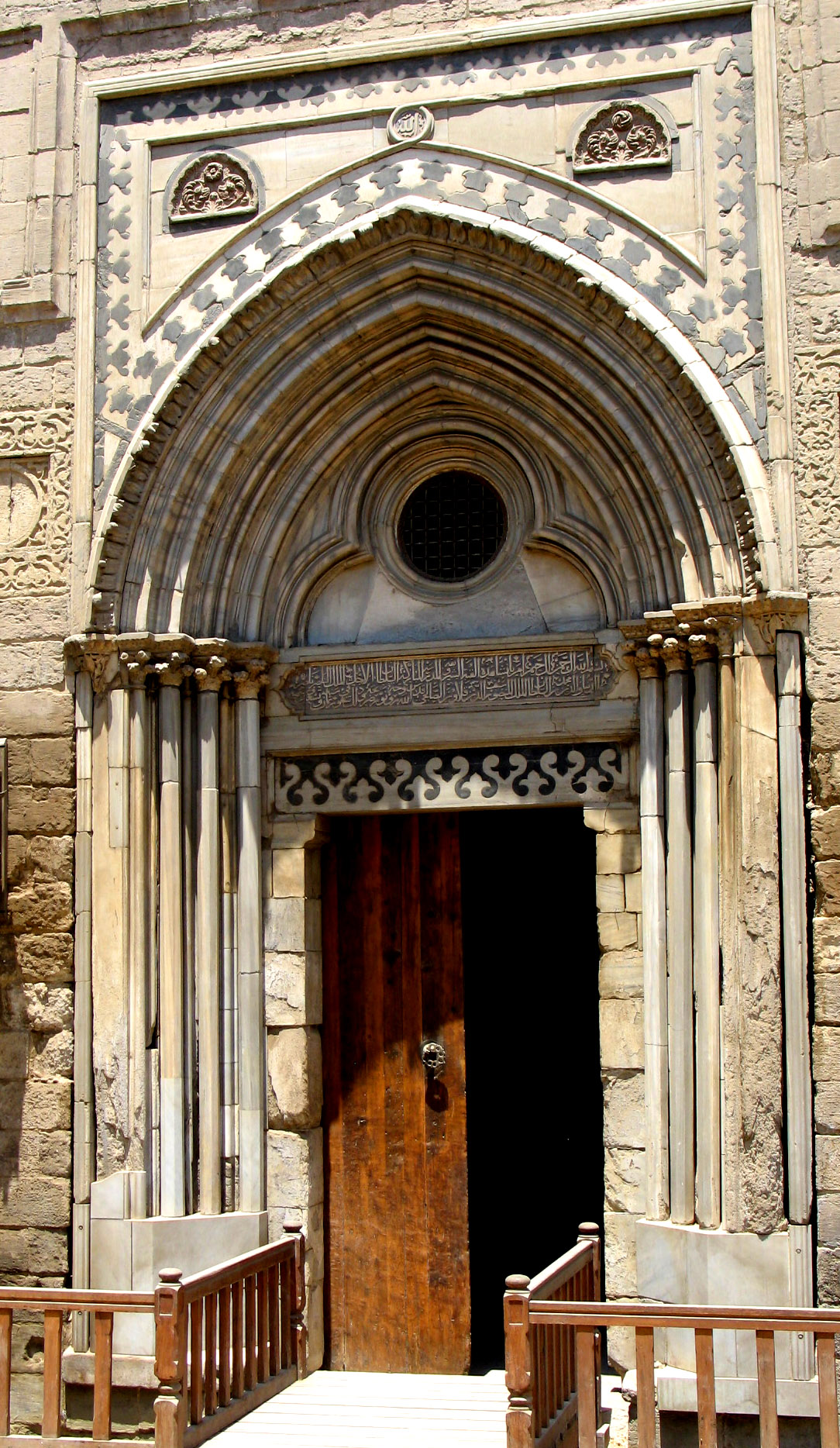
Gothic portal at the Madrasa of Al-Nasir Muhammad in Cairo, which may have belonged to the Church of Saint Andrew

In 1291 the city was destroyed by the Mamluk sultan Al-Ashraf Khalil. According to al-Maqrizi, after his victory the sultan ordered one of his amirs, ʿAlam al-Din Sanjar al-Shujaʿi al-Mansuri, to demolish the city walls and the churches. During this process, various building elements were taken away to Cairo as part of the plunder. One of these was a Gothic portal which was later incorporated into the Madrasa of Al-Nasir Muhammad, begun by Sultan Al-Adil Kitbugha in 1295 and completed by Sultan al-Nasir Muhammad in 1303. The origin of this portal is debated, but some authors, such as Camille Enlart, attribute it to the Church of Saint Andrew. The battered two-story shell and arched halls of the church remained standing in Acre until the 18th century.

The Greek Catholic church (Melkites) split from the Greek Orthodox church in 1724. In 1765, the church was rebuilt over the ruins of the medieval church. A sign near above the door near the entrance to the church shows the year of 1802, when the Greek Catholic Archbishopric was founded at the church. It later moved to Haifa.

== Present day ==
The church of St. Andrew is open to the public, and serves the Greek Catholic Melkite community. On the west side of the church, facing the sea, is a small courtyard. Embedded into the wall is a segment of a head of an ancient statue, possibly one of John the Baptist, which belonged to the older Crusader church. The modern church has an ornate Templon, decorated with icons and paintings, which separates the nave and the altar, or sanctuary. The icons are of Christ, the Virgin Mary, Apostles, John the Baptist, Saints and the prophet Elijah. The names above each icon are written in Arabic, and were crafted in Syria.

== See also ==
- Roman Catholicism in Israel
- Melkite Greek Catholic Archeparchy of Akka
