= Melkite Greek Catholic Eparchy of Saint Michael Archangel in Sydney =

Eastern Catholic eparchy in Australia

Coordinates: 33°54′41″S 151°03′20″E

Eparchy of Saint Michael Archangel in Sydney (Melkite Greek) Eparchia Sancti Michaëlis Sydneyensis Graecorum Melkitarum

Location
- Country: Australia

Statistics
- Population: (as of 2010); 50,000
- Parishes: 13

Information
- Denomination: Melkite Greek Catholic Church
- Rite: Byzantine Rite
- Established: 1987
- Cathedral: St. Michael and all the Angels Cathedral

Current leadership
- Pope: Leo XIV
- Patriarch: Youssef Absi
- Eparch: Robert Rabbat

The Melkite Greek Eparchy of Saint Michael Archangel (Latin: Eparchia Sancti Michaëlis Sydneyensis Graecorum Melkitarum) is based in Sydney suburb of Darlington, Australia. The eparchy is administered by Bishop Robert Rabbat. The Rt. Rev. Abdallah Sayegh is the current vicar general. The eparchy was established in March 1987.

== Territory and statistics ==
The eparchy includes all Catholic faithful of the Melkite Greek Catholic Church in Australia and New Zealand. Its eparchial seat is in the town of Darlington, a suburb of Sydney, in New South Wales, where is located the Cathedral of St. Michael and All Angels.

The territory is divided into 13 parishes and there were 50,000 Catholics in 2010.

== History ==
In the mid-19th century began the migration of Christians of the Melkite Greek Catholic Church to Australia. The first colonies fixed in Sydney, Brisbane and Melbourne, and later settled in other regions. After the number of believers was significantly increased, the need arose to exercise faith and the Eucharist in the Byzantine rite.

In 1889, an Archimandrite of the Basilian Chouerite Order of St. John the Baptist, Silwanos Mansour, was from Baalbek in Lebanon to Australia to visit his parents. At the request of the faithful, he remained, after he had obtained the administering approval of the Church in Sydney. Mansour began with the collection of donations, and in 1891 the cornerstone of the first church of the Melkite Greek Catholic community are placed. The foundation stone of the church was blessed by Bishop Higgins on behalf of the Roman Catholic Archbishop Patrick Francis Moran of Sydney. The dedication of the church took place in 1895 and was a meeting place for the Christian faithful from various Eastern Churches. Since 1895 at the church is sided the name "Saint Michael Archangel" Cathedral. Pope John Paul II implemented the eparchy with the Apostolic constitution Quae quantaque on 26 March 1987. The territory of the diocese is covering also New Zealand since 22 September 1999 when Pope John Paul II, by decree of the Congregation for the Oriental Churches, extended the jurisdiction of Eparchy also to the faithful of the Melkites in New Zealand.

== Bishops ==
- George Riashi, B.C. (26 March 1987 – 28 July 1995), appointed Archbishop of Tripoli del Libano {Tarabulus} (Melkite Greek)
- Issam John Darwich, BSO, D.D. (4 August 1995 – 15 June 2011), appointed Archbishop of Zahleh e Furzol (Melkite Greek), Lebanon
- Robert Rabbat (15 June 2011 – present)

== See also ==
- Roman Catholicism in Australia
