= Jean Mansour =

Jean Mansour, SMSP (born on 27 July 1928 in Baalbek, Lebanon - died on 17 November 2006) was Bishop and administrator in the Melkite Patriarchate of Antioch.

== Life ==
Jean Mansour was ordained to the priesthood on June 29, 1952 and became Chaplain of the Missionary Society of Saint Paul, a religious order of the Melkite Greek Catholic Church. On August 19, 1980 he received the appointment as auxiliary bishop and archbishop "pro hac vice" in Antioch with simultaneous appointment as Titular Archbishop of Apamea in Syria of Greek Melkites. The episcopal ordination was on October 19, 1980 by Patriarch of the Melkite Greek Catholic Church Maximos V Hakim. As co-consecrators assisted the Archbishops Nicolas Hajj, SDS of Banyas and Habib Bacha, SMSP of Beirut and Byblos.

Between 1980 and 1997 Mansour was auxiliary bishop, he took mainly administrative functions. He was from 1997 to 2002 Curial Bishop in the Patriarchate of Antioch and at times patriarchal administrator. His broader range of tasks included the co-consecration of bishops, such as when Joseph Kallas, SMSP, George Riashi, BC, Boutros Mouallem, SMSP, Fares Maakaroun, Georges Kahhale, BA, Salim Ghazal, BS and Elias Rahal, SMSP. One of his last duties was to co-consecrate Joseph Absi, SMSP in 2001.

On 17 October 2002 Archbishop Jean Mansour, according to age retired. He was, until his death on 17 November 2006, Patriarchal Auxiliary Emeritus.
