= Boutros Mouallem =

Israeli Melkite Greek Catholic hierarch (1928–2026)

Boutros Habib Mouallem, SMSP
- Archbishop Emeritus of Haifa
- Church: Melkite Greek Catholic
- See: Eparch of Akko, Haifa, Nazareth and All Galilee
- Installed: 29 July 1998
- Term ended: 18 July 2003
- Predecessor: Maximos Salloum
- Successor: Elias Chacour
- Previous post: Melkite Greek Catholic Archbishop of Akko, Haifa and the Galilee

Orders
- Ordination: 21 November 1955 by Pierre Kamel Medawar
- Consecration: 29 June 1990 by Maximos V Hakim, Jean Mansour and Jean Assaad Haddad

Personal details
- Born: 10 May 1928 Eilabun, Mandatory Palestine
- Died: 13 May 2026 (aged 98) Eilabun, Israel

Archbishop Boutros Habib Mouallem SMSP (10 May 1928 – 13 May 2026) was a Melkite Greek Catholic hierarch, who served as the Melkite Greek Catholic Archbishop of Akko, Haifa and the Galilee, in Israel from 1998 to 2003.

== Biography ==
Mouallem was born in Eilabun, Galilee, in 1928 and received his education at the Minor and Major Seminaries of St. Paul Missionaries, Harissa, Lebanon, and was ordained a priest on 21 November 1955 for the Missionary Society of St Paul.

From 1955 to 1975 he taught Arabic literature, French literature and humanities (Classical Greek and Latin) at the Seminary of St. Paul, Harissa, Lebanon. Then he taught philosophy, sociology and patristics at St. Anne of Jerusalem (Salahiyeh). He finally returned to Lebanon to teach theology, liturgy and Islamology at St. Paul's High Institute, Harissa.

From 1975 to 1987 he was the superior general of St. Paul's Society. He was consecrated bishop of Melkite Greek Catholic Eparchy of Nossa Senhora do Paraíso em São Paulo, Brazil, on 29 June 1990 by Patriarch Maximos V Hakim. In 1998, the Melkite Synod elected him Archbishop of Galilee. He resigned on 10 May 2003 due to his age.

He was active in seeking interfaith reconciliation and for championing the rights of Palestinians. He also sat on the Board of World Religious Leaders for the Elijah Interfaith Institute.

His election as archbishop of Galilee was actively opposed by the government of Israel, who said that he favours the Palestine Liberation Organization (PLO), resulting in a row between the Holy See and the government of Prime Minister Benjamin Netanyahu. The Holy See noted that selection of a bishop was matter reserved for the Church, "free of all external pressure", and that the Fundamental Accord between the Holy See and the State of Israel "provides for the autonomy of Church and State, each one in its own area." Sources close to Netanyahu said that he wanted to make a "courteous persuasion" in favour of the competing candidate after the PLO began to insistently intervene in favour of Mouallem.

Later, in October 2002, Archbishop Mouallem was prevented by Israeli airport guards from leaving Jerusalem to attend an interfaith meeting in London.

Mouallem died in his native Eilabun on 13 May 2026, at the age of 98.

== See also ==
- Palestinian Christians
