= Robert Rabbat =

Lebanese cleric (born 1960)

Robert Rabbat (born 14 February 1960, Beirut) is a Lebanese cleric who is the current eparch of the Melkite Greek Catholic Eparchy of Saint Michael Archangel in Sydney.

== Biography ==
Rabbat was born in Beirut, Lebanon in 1960. He lived in West Beirut up until the Lebanese civil war, when in 1976 he had to flee with his family to East Beirut. He studied at the Christian Brothers schools and graduated from Ashrafieh High School in Lebanon. In 1979 he came to the United States to study engineering at Ohio State University. In 1982 he graduated from OSU with a B.A. on Engineering and a B.A. in mathematics.

Rabbat's civil career took him to US, Europe and the Middle East as a technical consultant for the Middle East and Africa supervising desalination and water treatment projects with Dupont de Nemours International. He was a project manager for the 3rd. International Conference on Road Maintenance in the Middle East under the auspices of the International Road Federation.

Rabbat entered the seminary in Lebanon in 1989 and was ordained a priest for the Archdiocese of Beirut in 1994. He holds licentiates in philosophy and theology from St. Paul Institute for Philosophy and Theology in Harissa, Lebanon. He also holds an M.A. in communications from Purdue University in Indiana.

After ordination, Rabbat's pastoral assignments included assisting at St. Anthony the Great Church in Akkawi, Beirut. In 1995, Rabbat was sent to the United States to serve at St. Michael the Archangel Melkite Church in Hammond, Indiana. In 1999 he was appointed editor-in-chief of Sophia magazine, the Melkite Diocesan magazine for the United States, in addition to his other pastoral duties.

In 2000, Rabbat was appointed pastor of St. John the Baptist Melkite Church in Northlake, Illinois, and Holy Name Mission in Oaklawn, Illinois. He was appointed rector of the Annunciation Melkite Cathedral and elevated to the dignity of archimandrite in 2005
