= St. Elijah Cathedral, Haifa =

Coordinates: 32.8192°N 34.9947°E

St. Elijah Cathedral
- كاتدرائية مار إلياس
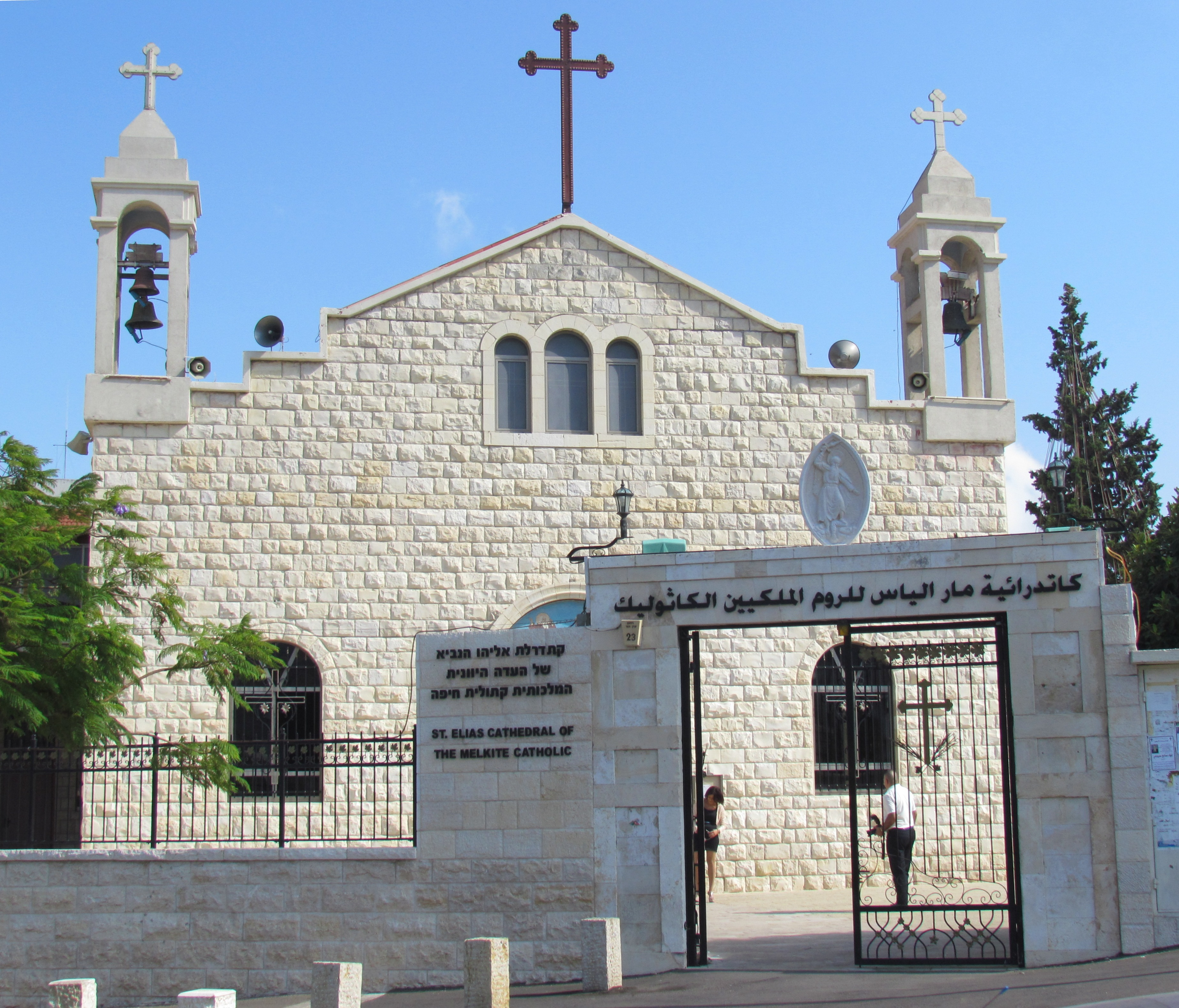
- St. Elijah Cathedral
- Location: Haifa
- Country: Israel
- Denomination: Catholic (Byzantine Rite)

St. Elijah Cathedral (Arabic: كاتدرائية مار إلياس, Hebrew: קתדרלת אליהו הנביא), also called St. Elias Greek-Melkite Cathedral, is the Melkite cathedral in Haifa, serving the Greek-Catholics of the Byzantine rite making up the majority of Christians in both Haifa and Israel. St. Elijah Cathedral is the cathedral of the Melkite Greek Catholic Archeparchy of Akka (Archieparchia Ptolemaidensis Melchitarum), which was created by bull Episcopalis synodus of Pope Paul VI.

The cathedral was designed by architect Sammihom Atallah. The construction of the cathedral began in 1938 and ended in 1939. Since 1861 the cathedral of the Archdiocese of Akka was the church of the Virgin Mary in Haifa. After the Arab-Israeli war (between 1947 and 1949), most Melkites, who lived in the area, moved to the lower city of Haifa, and the bishop's chair was moved to the church St. Elijah (St. Elias).

The front of the cathedral is crowned with a cross, which is a few meters away from a small bell tower. On the portal is the biblical story of the prophet Elijah.

== See also ==
- Catholic Church in Israel
- St. Elijah Cathedral, Aleppo

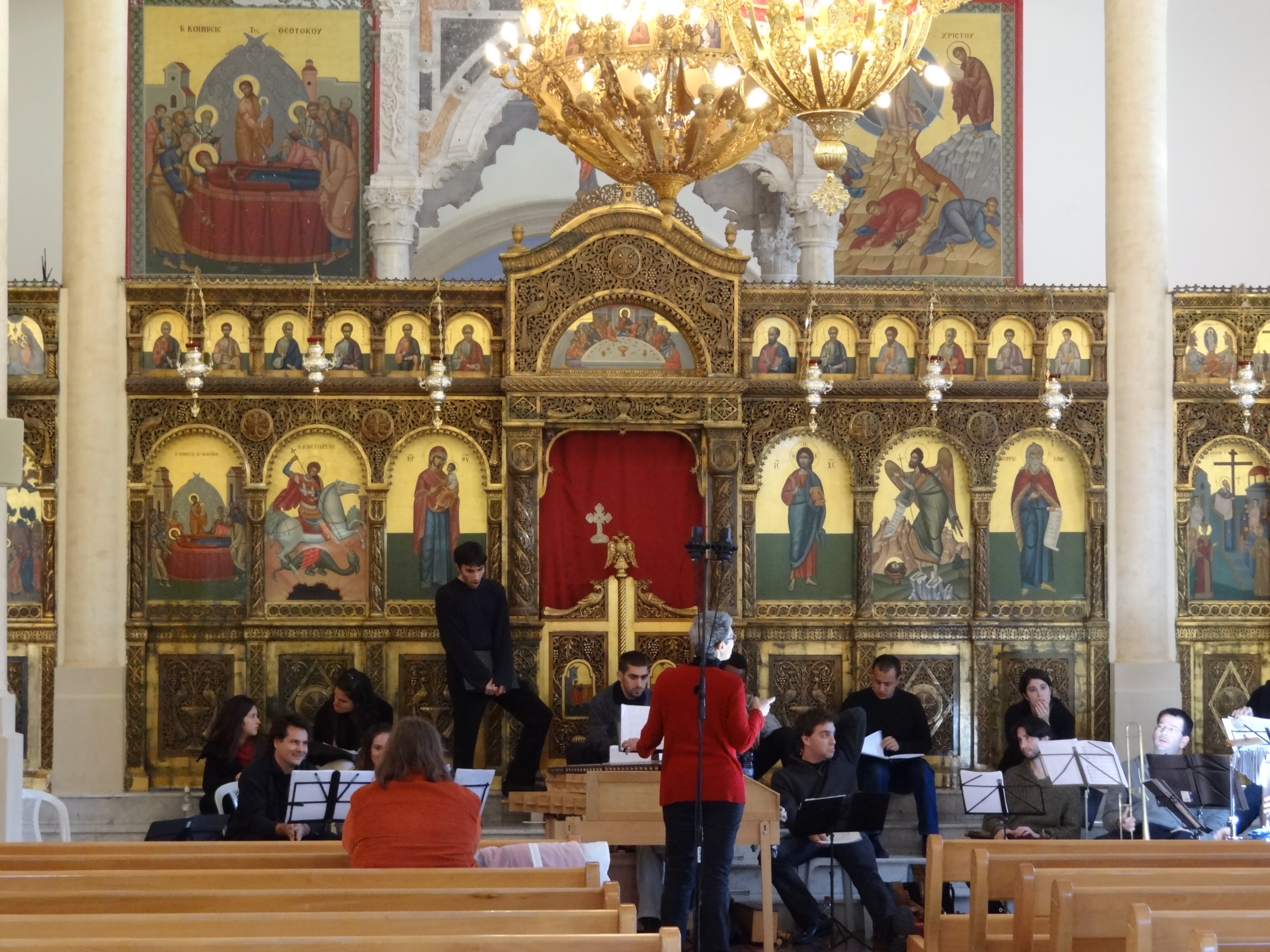
Internal View
