= Habib Bacha =

Habib Bacha SMSP
- Archeparch of Beirut and Byblos
- Native name: حبيب باشا
- Church: Melkite Greek Catholic Church
- Archdiocese: Archeparchy of Beirut and Byblos
- In office: 23 August 1975 – 23 November 1999
- Predecessor: Grégoire Haddad
- Successor: Joseph Kallas

Orders
- Ordination: 29 June 1956
- Consecration: 14 September 1975 by Maximos V Hakim

Personal details
- Born: 24 June 1931 Tyre, Mandatory Lebanese Republic, French Empire
- Died: 23 November 1999 (aged 68)

Habib Bacha SMSP (Arabic: حبيب باشا; 24 June 1931 in Tyre – 23 November 1999) was Melkite Archbishop of the Melkite Greek Catholic Archeparchy of Beirut and Byblos.

== Priests and promotion ==
Habib Bacha received his priestly ordination on 29 June 1956 leading church offices. Previously, he was at the seminary of St. Paul in Jerusalem, where completed his studies in theology and philosophy. Bacha was appointed in 1975 Melkite Archbishop of Beirut and Byblos and continued his studies in Rome after episcopal ordination. He received his title of Doctor in Theology in Rome and at the same time he taught at the Pontifical Institute for Arabic and Islamic Studies, where he was secretary for Islam. From 1968 to 1975 he was Superior General of the Congregation of the St. Paul.

== Archbishop ==
On 23 August 1975, Habib Bacha was appointed Archbishop of Beirut and Byblos. The consecration took place on 14 September 1975, being his consecrator Archbishop Maximos V Hakim (Melkite Patriarch of the Patriarchate of Antioch). The co-consecrators were Jean Bassoul, BS (Archbishop of Zahle and Furzol) and Nicolas Naaman, MSSP (Archbishop of Bosra and Hauran). In 1979 started the official theological dialogue between the Eastern Orthodox Church and the Roman Catholic Church. Of the 29 representatives of the Roman Catholic Church Habib Bacha was of the Melkite Greek Catholic Church. Between 1985 and 1987 Bacha was also Apostolic Administrator of Banyas. During the apostolic visit of Pope John Paul II in 1997, he was Chairman of the Episcopal Commission for the Laity and responsible representative of the youth in Lebanon. At 68 years old Habib Bacha died on 23 November 1999 of a heart attack.

== Consecrations ==
He consecrated in 1995 future Archbishop Georges Bacouni of Tyre priest and also consecrated bishop Spiridon Mattar (Bishop of Nossa Senhora do Paraíso em São Paulo), Archbishop "pro hac vice" Jean Mansour, SMSP (auxiliary bishop in the Melkite Patriarchate of Antioch and Titular Archbishop of Apamea in Syria of Greek Melkites), Boulos Nassif Borkhoche, SMSP (Archbishop of Bosra and Hauran), Abraham Nehmé, BC (Archbishop of Homs, Syria) and Jean-Clément Jeanbart (Archbishop of Aleppo in Syria).
