= Diocese of Beirut =

Diocese of Beirut or Eparchy of Beirut may refer to:

- Syriac Catholic Diocese of Beirut, patriarchal diocese of the Syriac Catholic Church, centered in Beirut
- Chaldean Catholic Diocese of Beirut, a Chaldean Catholic diocese, centered in Beirut
- Roman Catholic Diocese of Beirut, former (medieval) Roman Catholic diocese, centered in Beirut

It may also refer to:

- Armenian Apostolic Diocese of Lebanon, an Armenian Oriental-Orthodox diocese, centered in Beirut

== See also ==
- Archdiocese of Beirut (disambiguation)
- Archbishop of Beirut (disambiguation)
- Christianity in Lebanon
