= Philippe Nabaa =

Philippe Nabaa S.M.S.P.
- Archeparch of Beirut and Byblos
- Church: Melkite Greek Catholic Church
- Archdiocese: Archeparchy of Beirut and Byblos
- In office: 17 September 1948 – 17 August 1967
- Predecessor: Maximos IV Sayegh
- Successor: Grégoire Haddad

Orders
- Ordination: 14 September 1931
- Consecration: 3 October 1948 by Maximos IV Sayegh

Personal details
- Born: 18 April 1907 Joun, Mount Lebanon Mutasarrifate, Ottoman Empire
- Died: 17 August 1967 (aged 60) Beirut, Lebanon

Philippe Nabaa (born 18 April 1907, in Joun, Ottoman Empire – died on 17 August 1967, in Beirut, Lebanon) was Archeparch of the Melkite Greek Catholic Archeparchy of Beirut and Byblos.

== Biography ==
On 14 September 1931, Philippe Nabaa was ordained at the age of 24 as a priest. The appointment as Archbishop was on 17 September 1948 and on 3 October of the same year he was ordained a bishop. He was the successor of Maximos IV Sayegh and took in his role at the four sessions of the Second Vatican Council in part. From 1962 to 1967 he was Undersecretary in the Pontifical Commission for the interpretation of the decrees of the Second Vatican Council.

Nabaa was consecrator of the Archbishops Augustin Farah (Bishop of Tripoli and later Archbishop of Zahleh e Furzol of the Melkite Greek Catholic Church) and from his own successor Grégoire Haddad.
