= Maximos Salloum =

- Archbishop of Haifa
- Church: Melkite Greek Catholic
- See: Eparchate of Akko, Haifa, Nazareth and All Galilee
- In office: 20 August 1975 – 23 July 1997
- Predecessor: Archbishop Joseph Raya
- Successor: Archbishop Pierre Mouallem

Maximos Salloum (born 2 December 1920 in Yaroun, Lebanon - died on 28 October 2004) was Archbishop of the Melkite Greek Catholic Archeparchy of Akka in Israel from 1975 to 1997. The bishop's seat is in Haifa.

== Life ==
On July 20, 1946, Salloum received his ordination to the priesthood and became on August 20, 1975, Archbishop of Akka, Haifa, Nazareth and all Galilee. His ordination was on 14 September 1975 by Patriarch of Antioch Maximos V Hakim. As co-consecrators assisted the archbishops Georges Haddad of Tyre and Joseph Tawil of Newton (USA). In 1982, Salloum founded a social institution in the Madonna Church in Haifa built in 1862 available today has "house of grace". On 23 July 1997 the archbishop became emeritus until his death as retired Archbishop of Akka. In 2004 Salloum died and was succeeded by Archbishop Boutros Mouallem.
