= Qâa er Rîm =

Qâa er Rîm قاع الريم
- Village
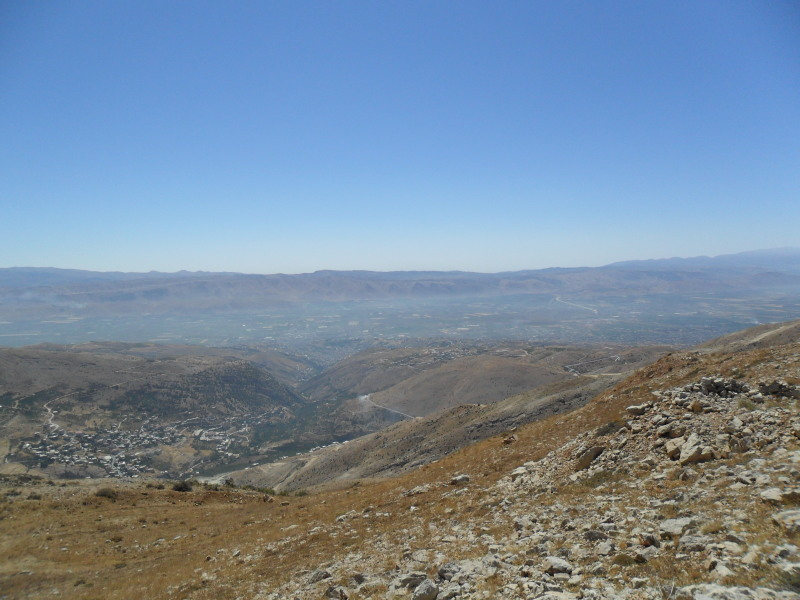
- Qâa er Rîm, panorama

- Location in Lebanon
- Coordinates: 33°53′05″N 35°52′31″E
- Country: Lebanon
- Governorate: Beqaa Governorate
- District: Zahlé
- Elevation: 4,100 ft (1,250 m)
- Time zone: UTC+2 (EET)
  - Summer (DST): +3

Qâa er Rîm (Arabic: قاع الريم, romanized: Qāʿ ar-Rīm) (also known as Qā‘ar Rīm) is a village in the Beqaa Governorate of Lebanon. It is located at the centre of Lebanon
