= Grégoire Haddad =

Lebanese archbishop (1924–2015)

- Archeparch of the Melkite Greek Catholic Archeparchy of Beirut and Byblos
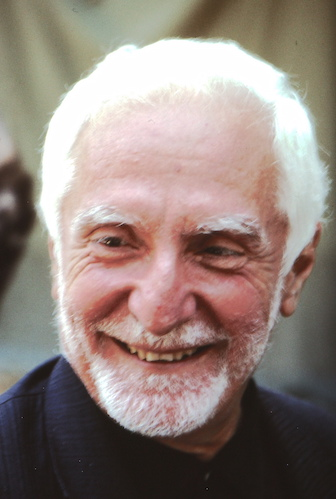
- Haddad in 1990
- Installed: 1968
- Term ended: 1975

Personal details
- Born: September 25, 1924 Souk El-Gharb, Lebanon
- Died: December 23, 2015 (aged 91)

Grégoire Haddad (Arabic: غريغوار حداد; 25 September 1924 – 23 December 2015) was the Archeparch of the Melkite Greek Catholic Archeparchy of Beirut and Byblos from 1968 to 1975. He was known as the "Red Bishop of Beirut" promoting a secular "social movement" and a platform of rapprochement between Muslims and Christians with the onslaught of the Lebanese Civil War. He reinforced his controversial viewpoints through further secular movements and through Afaq magazine, which he founded. In 1975 under pressure from the Holy See, he resigned from active religious duty. Since his resignation, he became an emeritus archbishop without holding an actual diocese in Lebanon.

== Early life and education ==
Grégoire Haddad (in Arabic غريغوار حدّاد) was born as Nakhle Amine Haddad (نخلة أمين حداد) in Souk El Gharb, a small town in Lebanon. His father Amine Nakhle Haddad was a Protestant Christian and his mother Mathilde Nawfal belonged to the Melkite Greek Catholic Church. He attended elementary school in Souk el Gharb High School from 1934 to 1936, after which he spent a year in a Basilian secondary school. By 1943 he was in a school of the Eastern Churches taught by Jesuits and ended his high school. Haddad began the study of philosophy and theology, and in 1949 was ordained to the priesthood by Archbishop Philippe Nabaa, his predecessor in the Episcopate of Beirut (1948-1967).

== Career ==
He then worked as a secretary in the Archbishop's Ordinariate in Beirut and devoted himself to several social projects, and founded the Lebanese social movement. On 30 July 1965, with an appointment would come Bishop in Beirut and Byblos and titular bishop of Palmyra of Greek Melkites. On 5 September 1965 he was ordained to the episcopate by Maximos IV Sayegh, SMSP (Archbishop of Beirut and Byblos from 1933 to 1947) and his co-consecrators were Archbishop Philippe Nabaa (Archbishop of Beirut and Byblos 1948-1967) and Archbishop Joseph Tawil (Archbishop of the Eparchy of Newton). In this role, Haddad also participated in the fourth session of the Second Vatican Council in part. After the death of the archbishop, he led the Diocese of Beirut and was appointed on 9 September 1968 to the Melkite Archbishopric of Beirut and Byblos. He was a consecrator of the Archbishops Elias Nijmé, BA (Archbishop of the Archeparchy of Tripoli) and Jean Assaad Haddad (Archbishop of Tyre).

In the first years of his term, the new archbishop had many decisions of the Second Vatican Council to implement. This included the new situation for the participation of the laity. His active contacts with the Shiite Imam Musa al-Sadr, the founder of the Shiite Amal movement and his commitment to work with political and lay (non-religious) conditions, led to warnings from the Vatican. Together Haddad and al-Sadr founded in 1960 the Social Movement" (in Arabic الحركة الاجتماعية) and promoted in the following years, the Islamic-Christian dialogue. Following that, Musa al-Sadr held a speech during Easter in a Capuchin church.

Haddad also founded in the 1960s a number of other auxiliary movements to his Social Movement including Self Education (التثقيف الذاتي), the Ecumenical Movement for Youth (الحركة المسكونية للشبيبة), the inter-scholar United Club (النادي الموحّد), Oasis of Hope (واحة الرجاء) to work with the grassroots Social Movement.

In addition, Grégoire Haddad was active in publishing articles and giving media interviews about his theory about a rapprochement between socialism and the Church saying he represented increasing public opinion on more secularization. In 1974-1975, he founded the periodical Afaq (in Arabic آفاق meaning horizons) in which he elaborated his views. This put him in further conflict with his religious critics, the Greek Catholic Patriarch and the Greek Catholic Holy Synodus and eventually with the Congregation for the Doctrine of the Faith that examined his controversial viewpoints without finding evidence of deviation from church doctrine but leaving the final decision about him to the ruling Patriarch and Holy Synodus. His writings and speeches led to more escalated and heated debates in the media. His objective was to attempt to promote a peaceful religion in touch with laity.

As political pressure mounted on him, followed by threat of sanctions within the Greek Catholic Church eventually leading Grégoire Haddad to resign from his post as Archbishop of Beirut and Byblos on 19 September 1975. Pope Paul VI in a concurrent appointment gave him the Titular title as Archbishop of Adana of Greek Catholic Melkites (Turkey) with no actual congregation to tend to. After his resignation he retired to a monastery, and refused any further bishop offices offered to him within the Melkite Greek Catholic Church, except for a brief period as temporary replacement to the deceased Greek Catholic Bishop of Tyre in 1986-1987.

Grégoire Haddad spent most of his remaining time in seclusion Faraya, Laqlouq, Akoura (1992-1997) and in the Patriarchate in Rabweh, preferring to continue promote social movements in Lebanon without implicating his Church further, preferring to work under his personal title. In the year 2000, he established along with a secular elite Civil Society Movement (in Arabic تيار المجتمع المدني) with clear political, social and secular reformist agenda.

== See also ==
- Melkite Greek Catholic Church
