= Joseph Kallas =

His Excellency Joseph Kallas
- Archbishop of Melkite Greek Catholic Archeparchy of Beirut and Byblos
- Church: Melkite Greek Catholic Church
- Installed: 15 January 2000
- Term ended: 25 May 2010
- Predecessor: Habib Bacha
- Successor: Cyril Salim Bustros

Orders
- Ordination: 13 August 1958
- Consecration: 19 February 2000 by Jean Mansour

Personal details
- Born: 20 October 1931 (age 94) Fakiha, Greater Lebanon
- Denomination: Melkite Greek Catholic Church

Joseph Kallas, SMSP (born 20 October 1931) is Archbishop Emeritus of the Melkite Greek Catholic Archeparchy of Beirut and Byblos.

== Biography ==
Kallas was born, in Fakiha, Lebanon. He was ordained a priest on 13 August 1958 by the White Fathers, and joinedthe Melkite congregation Missionary Society of St. Paul, where he was Superior General from 1987 to 1993. On 15 January 2000 Kallas was appointed Archbishop of Beirut and Byblos of the Melkites. The ordination took place on 19 February 2000 and was performed by Jean Mansour SMSP, Titular Archbishop "pro hac vice" of Apamea in Syria of Greek Melkites and Auxiliary Bishop of Antioch. André Haddad BS, Archbishop of Zahle and Furzol, and Jean Assaad Haddad, Archbishop of Tyre were his co-consecrators. On 25 May 2010, Kallas resigned from his office of bishop.

== Inter-religious dialogue ==
The archbishop Kallas encouraged inter-religious dialogue between Islam and the Christians, and participated in many events. This included participation in the series "People in Europe" where in 2004 participated beside him Archbishop Louis Sako (Archbishop of the Chaldean Catholic Church in Kirkuk, Iraq), Bishop Antoine Audo, SJ (Bishop of the Chaldean Catholic Church in Aleppo, Syria) and the Catholic theologian Theodore Khoury.

During 10–24 October 2010, he participated in the Special Assembly of the Synod of Bishops for the Middle East and intervened to understanding the Melkite Greek Catholic Church. Basically, Kallas underlined the serious and historical development in the Eastern Churches and their apostolic understanding within the meaning of Apostle Paul of Tarsus.

Under the direction of Gregory III Laham, he participated at the Synod of the Melkite Greek Catholic bishops.

Archbishop Kallas was consecrator of Joseph Absi, SMSP, Titular Bishop of Tarsus of Greek Melkites and Auxiliary Bishop of Antioch, Georges Bacouni, Archbishop of Tyre, Michel Abrass, BA, Titular Archbishop of Myra of Greek Melkites and Auxiliary Bishop of Antioch, and Elie Bechara Haddad, BS, Archbishop of Sidon.
