= Missionary Society of St Paul (Melkites) =

Melkite Greek Catholic Society of Apostolic Life

Missionary Society of St. Paul
- Societas Missionarium Sancti Pauli
- Abbreviation: SMSP
- Formation: 15 August 1903
- Founder: Germanos Mouakkad
- Type: Society of apostolic life
- Legal status: Active
- Headquarters: Harissa, Lebanon
- Parent organization: Melkite Greek Catholic Church

The Missionary Society of St. Paul (Latin: Societas Missionarium Sancti Pauli; abbreviated SMSP; French: Société des missionnaires de Saint Paul), commonly known as the Paulist Missionaries or Paulists of Harissa, is a Melkite Greek Catholic society of apostolic life. Founded in Lebanon in 1903, the society is primarily dedicated to rural missions, education, and religious publishing within the Middle East.

== History ==
The society was founded on 15 August 1903, by Germanos Mouakkad, the Melkite Bishop of Baalbek. Mouakkad, a former monk of the Basilian Salvatorian Order, recognized a need for a dedicated group of "missionary priests" who could serve outside the traditional monastic enclosure. His vision was to create a community that would conduct "popular missions" to support the spiritual and catechetical needs of Melkite faithful living in remote rural areas of the Levant.

The society established its center in Harissa, overlooking the Bay of Jounieh. In 1968, during the tenure of Superior General Habib Bacha, the society was formally recognized by the Holy See as a Society of Apostolic Life of Pontifical Right.

== Mission and Activities ==
The Paulist Missionaries focus on several key pillars of ministry:

- Preaching and Missions: The core of their charism is the "popular mission," which involves traveling to parishes to lead retreats, provide religious instruction, and strengthen the local community's faith.
- Education: The society operates several educational institutions, most notably the Saint Paul Institute of Philosophy and Theology in Harissa, which serves as a major seminary for Melkite clergy and a theological center for laity.
- Publishing: The society manages the Paulist Press (French: Imprimerie Saint-Paul). It is one of the most prolific religious publishing houses in the Arab world, producing liturgical texts, scholarly research, and the monthly magazine Al-Maçarrat.
- Ecumenical Dialogue: Due to their heritage, the Paulists are deeply involved in promoting dialogue between the Melkite Greek Catholic Church and the Antiochian Orthodox Church

== Notable Members ==
- Maximos IV Sayegh (1878–1967): A member of the society who was elected Melkite Patriarch of Antioch and later named a Cardinal. He was a prominent figure at the Second Vatican Council.
- Habib Bacha (1931–1999): Former Superior General of the society and later Archbishop of Beirut and Jbeil.

== See also ==
- Eastern Catholic Churches
- Catholic Church in Lebanon
