= Melkite Greek Catholic Archeparchy of Beirut and Byblos =

Eastern Catholic archeparchy in Lebanon

Coordinates: 33.8833°N 35.5000°E

Archeparchy of Beirut and Byblos (Melkite Greek) Archieparchia Berytensis et Gibailensis Graecorum Melkitarum
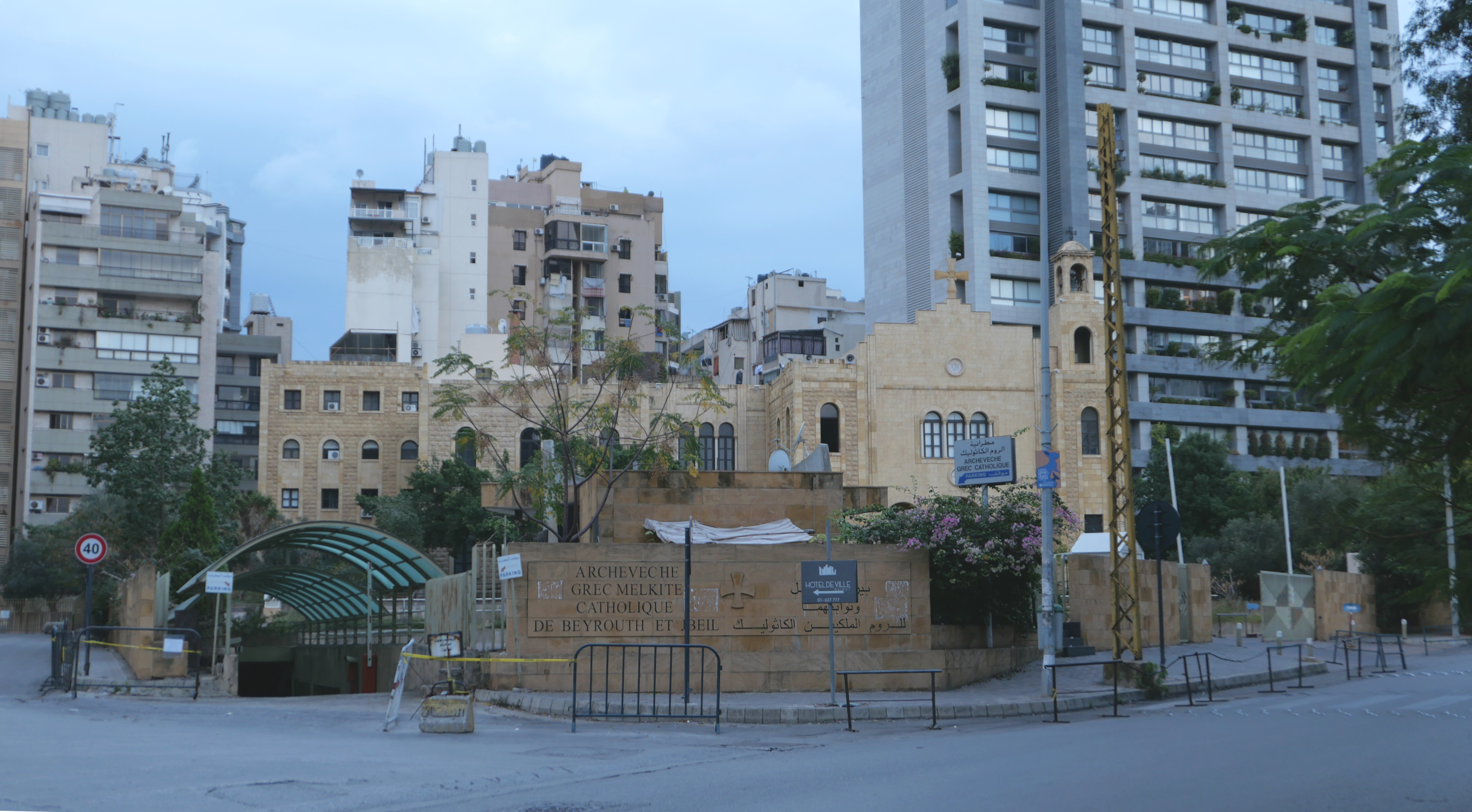
- The Melkite Greek Catholic Archeparchy of Beirut and Byblos in Beirut, Damascus Street

Location
- Country: Lebanon

Statistics
- Population: (as of 2015); 200,000
- Parishes: 83

Information
- Denomination: Melkite Greek Catholic Church
- Rite: Byzantine Rite
- Established: 16 August 1881 (145 years ago)
- Cathedral: Saint Elias Greek Catholic Cathedral

Current leadership
- Pope: Leo XIV
- Patriarch: Youssef Absi
- Archeparch: Georges Bacouni, SMSP
- Bishops emeritus: Joseph Kallas, SMSP

The Archeparchy of Beirut and Byblos (in Latin: Archieparchia Berytensis et Gibailensis Graecorum Melkitarum) is a metropolitan eparchy of the Melkite Greek Catholic Church since 1881, an Eastern Catholic church in communion with the Roman Catholic Church. Located in Lebanon, it includes the cities of Beirut and Byblos, and in terms of population, it is the largest Melkite eparchy in the Middle East. Its current Eparch, Georges Wadih Bacouni, S.M.S.P., was elected in November 2018.

== Territory and statistics ==
The territory of the archeparchy includes Beirut, the capital of Lebanon, and its environs; much of Mount Lebanon governorate (to the north Antelias, Jounieh, and Byblos; to the east Baabda, Broumana, and Bikfaya) and south to part of Chouf District. The archeparchy has an estimated population of 200,000 Melkite faithful in 2015. Its cathedral is dedicated to Saint Elias and its see is located in Beirut. It includes 114 priests, 83 men religious, 179 women religious, and 83 parishes.

== History ==
The Eparchy of Beirut is an ancient Byzantine one, elevated to the rank of archeparchy with the Council of Chalcedon in the fifth century.

The Greek Catholic Eparchy of Beirut was officially founded in 1724, after the Patriarch of Antioch was divided into two branches, the Greek Orthodox and Greek Catholic (or Melkite).

In 1701, the Greek bishop of Beirut, Sylvester Dahan, had sent to Rome a profession of the Catholic faith, renewed in the following year. Those were the years when Catholicism obtained great progress in the ranks of the Greeks in the cities of the Lebanese coast, where more entrenched was the presence of Christians of the Byzantine Rite, and this mainly thanks to the missionary work of the Jesuits and the Capuchins.

Great impetus to the spread of Catholicism in Beirut and in the surrounding areas was the founding of the Chouerites, that at the beginning of their history had most of the monasteries in Beirutian territory. Belonged to this Order was Athanasios Dahan, Catholic Bishop of Beirut and the future patriarch, who first organized the new Catholic diocese.

With his successor Basilios Jelghaf the cathedral was built on land owned by the Chouerites. A dispute between the Order and the Bishop Youssef Sarrouf about the real estate of the cathedral forced the Holy See to intervene to give reason to the Bishop (1784).

The bishop Agapios Riashi was one of the most vocal opponents of the introduction of the Gregorian calendar desired by Patriarch Maximos III Mazloum. Riashi was responsible for the reconstruction of the cathedral in a more impressive and rich decorations including an iconostasis in marble. This church was demolished in the twentieth century for urban needs.

On the death of Agapios Riashi in 1878 the Melkite community is divided on the choice of his successor. The Chouerites, which so far had given all the bishops of Beirut, and they considered the seat as their fiefdom, lived a difficult time and had no monks prepared for the episcopate. Patriarch Gregory II Youssef was Damascene and Melkite Beirut feared that ended up imposing a native bishop of Damascus. Eventually prevailed to the Holy See, when Pope Leo XIII with his Papal brief Occasione electionis on August 16, 1881, chose Meletios Fakak transferring him from his see in Zahleh and appointing to new Melkite Greek Catholic Archeparchy of Beirut and Byblos. The former Eparchy of Beirut was elevated to the rank of the Archeparchy, uniting it to the seat of Byblos, formerly administered by the bishops of Beirut since 1802. Byblos corresponds to the ancient Byzantine Diocese of Byblos, mentioned in the fourth century. Fakak made his solemn entry only September 30, 1882.

== Church of the Archdiocese Melkite Greek Catholic of Beirut and Jbeil ==
Archdiocese Melkite Greek Catholic of Beirut and Jbeil at Beirut, 655 rue de Damas.

=== Outside ===
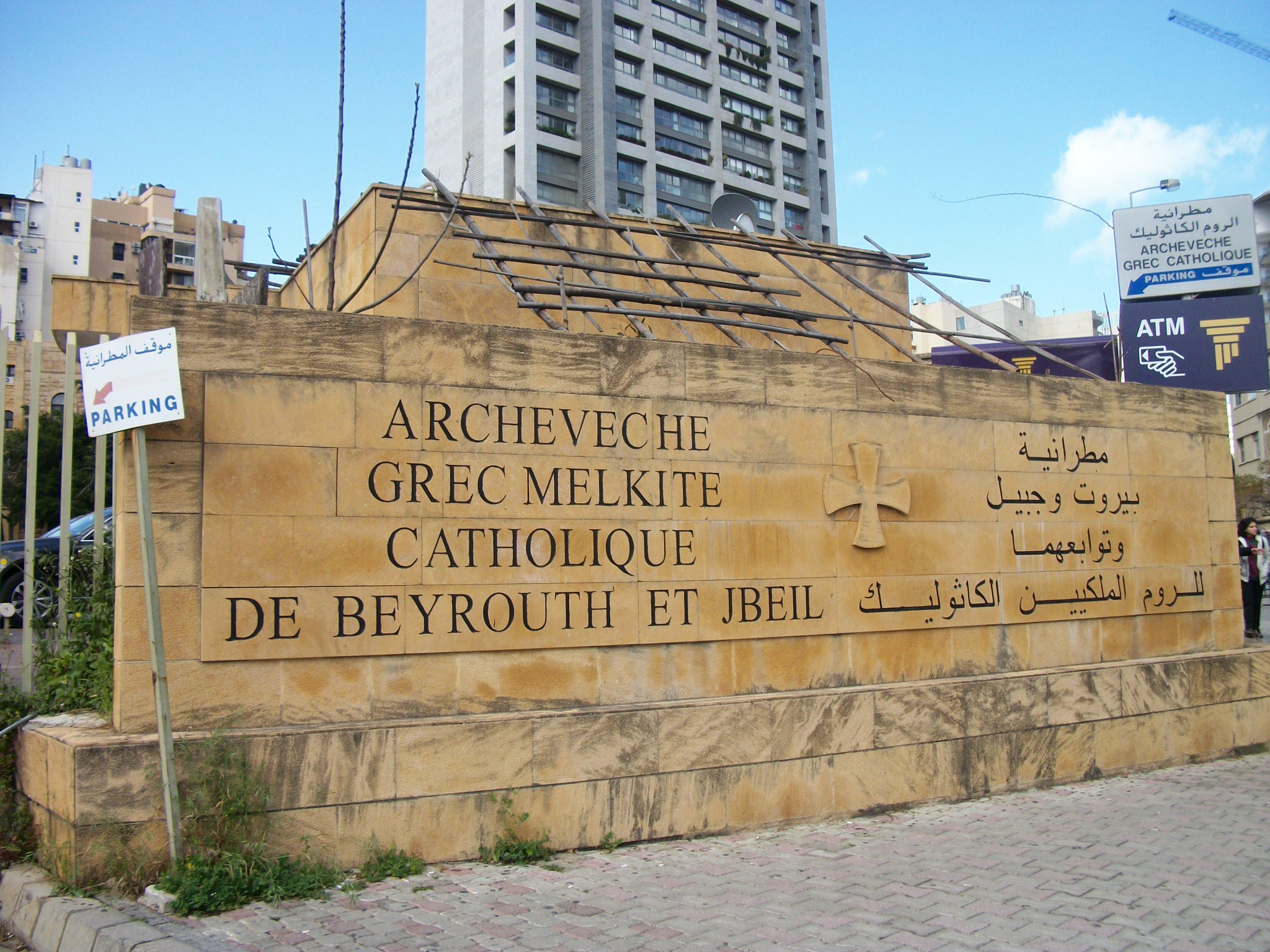

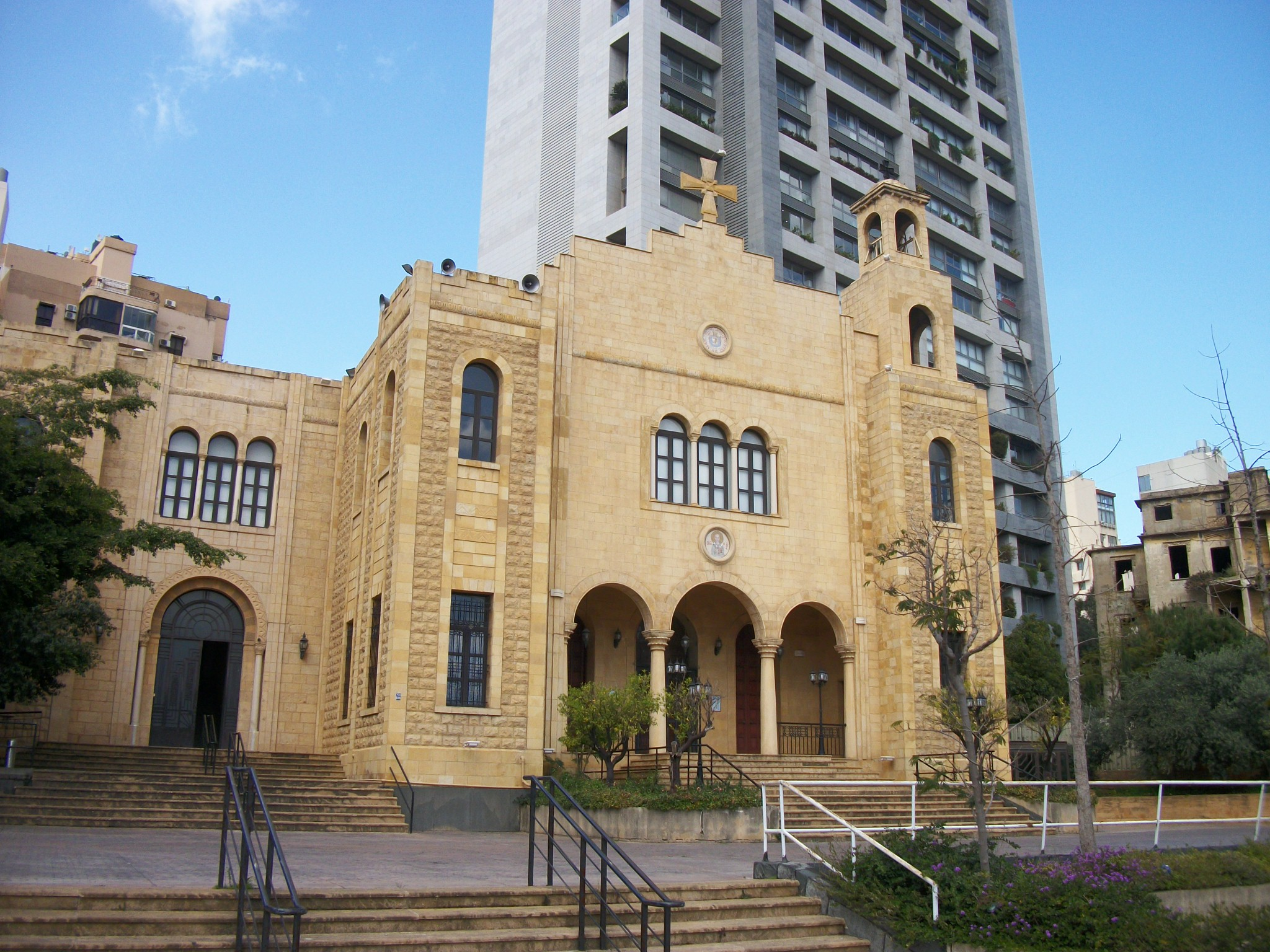

=== Inside ===
Frescoes, Byzantine and Orthodox icons inside the church.

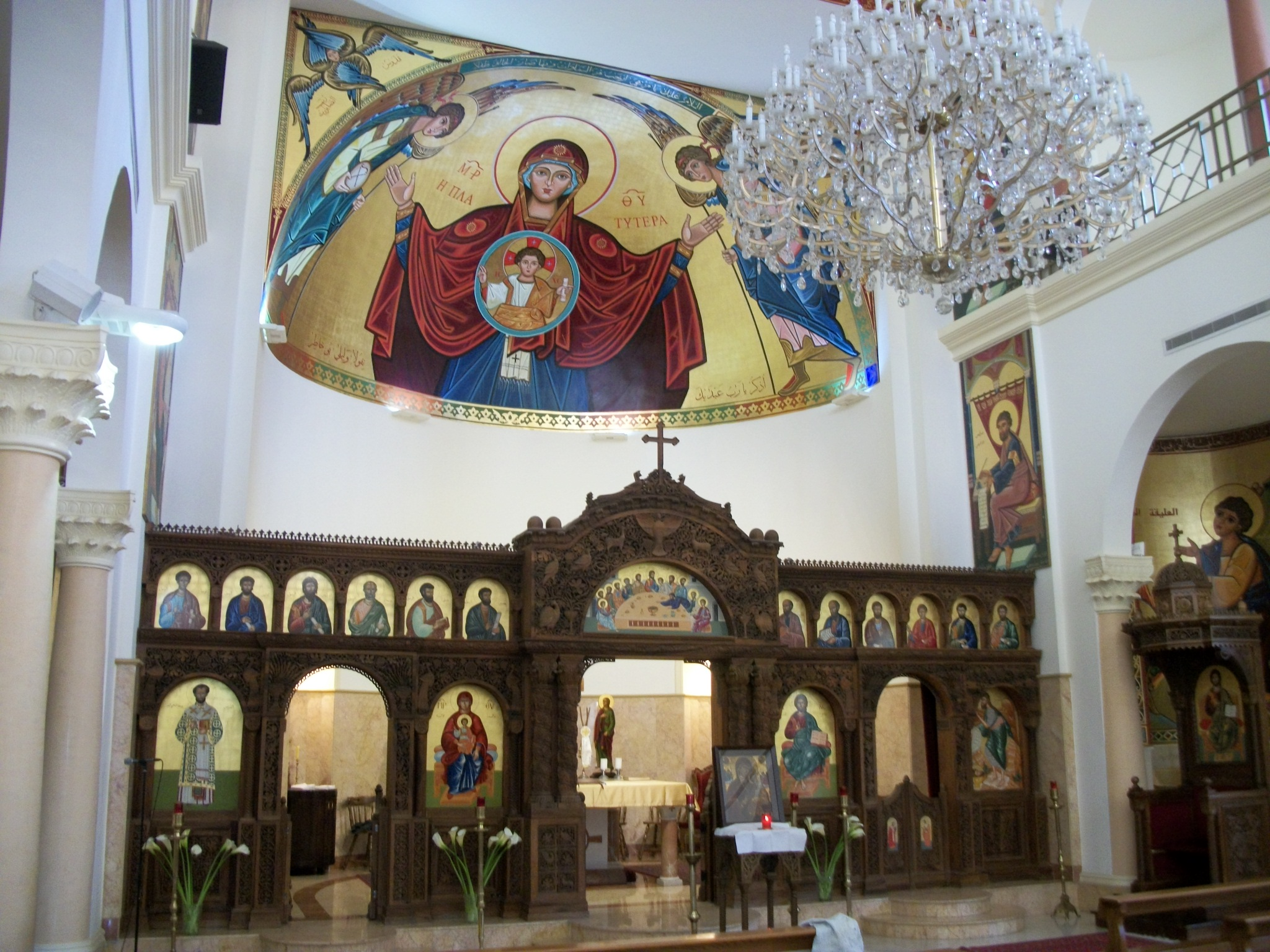

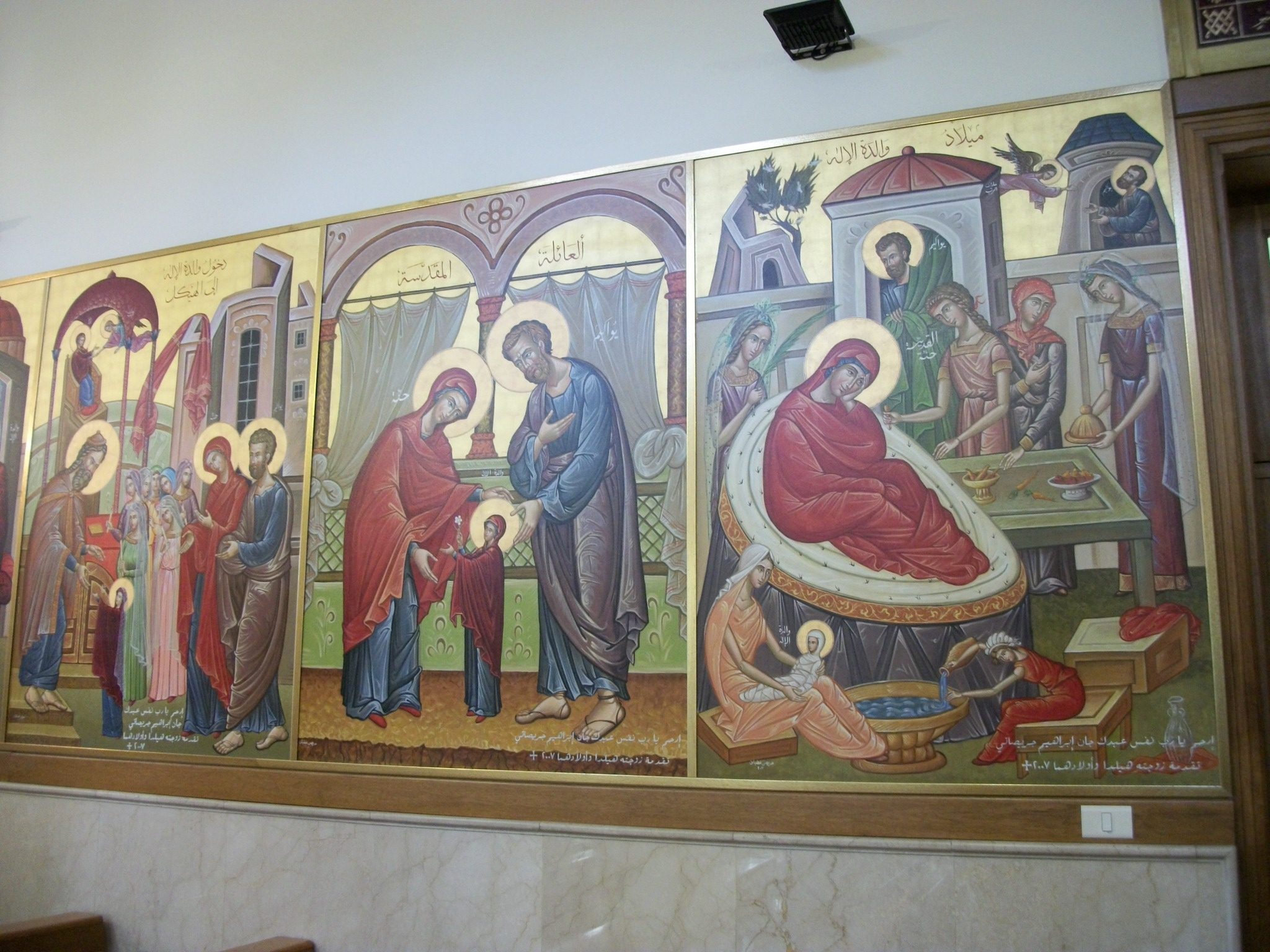
The main scenes from Marie's life. Reading from right to left : the Nativity of mary, Mary's parents (Joachim and Anne), the Presentation of Mary (with the annunciation in the background)

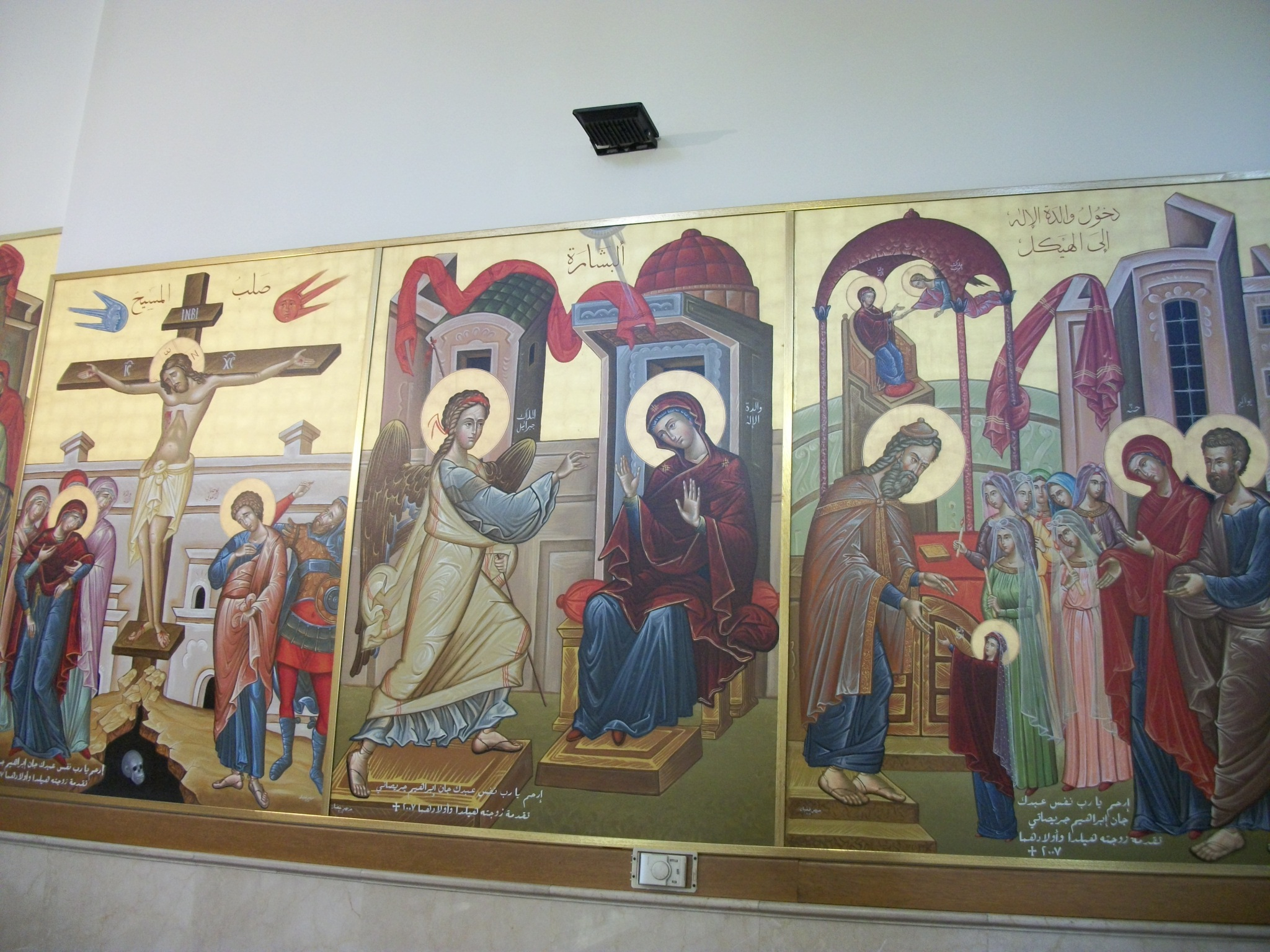
Reading from right to left : the Presentation of Mary (with the annunciation in the background), the annunciation, the crucifixion of Jesus

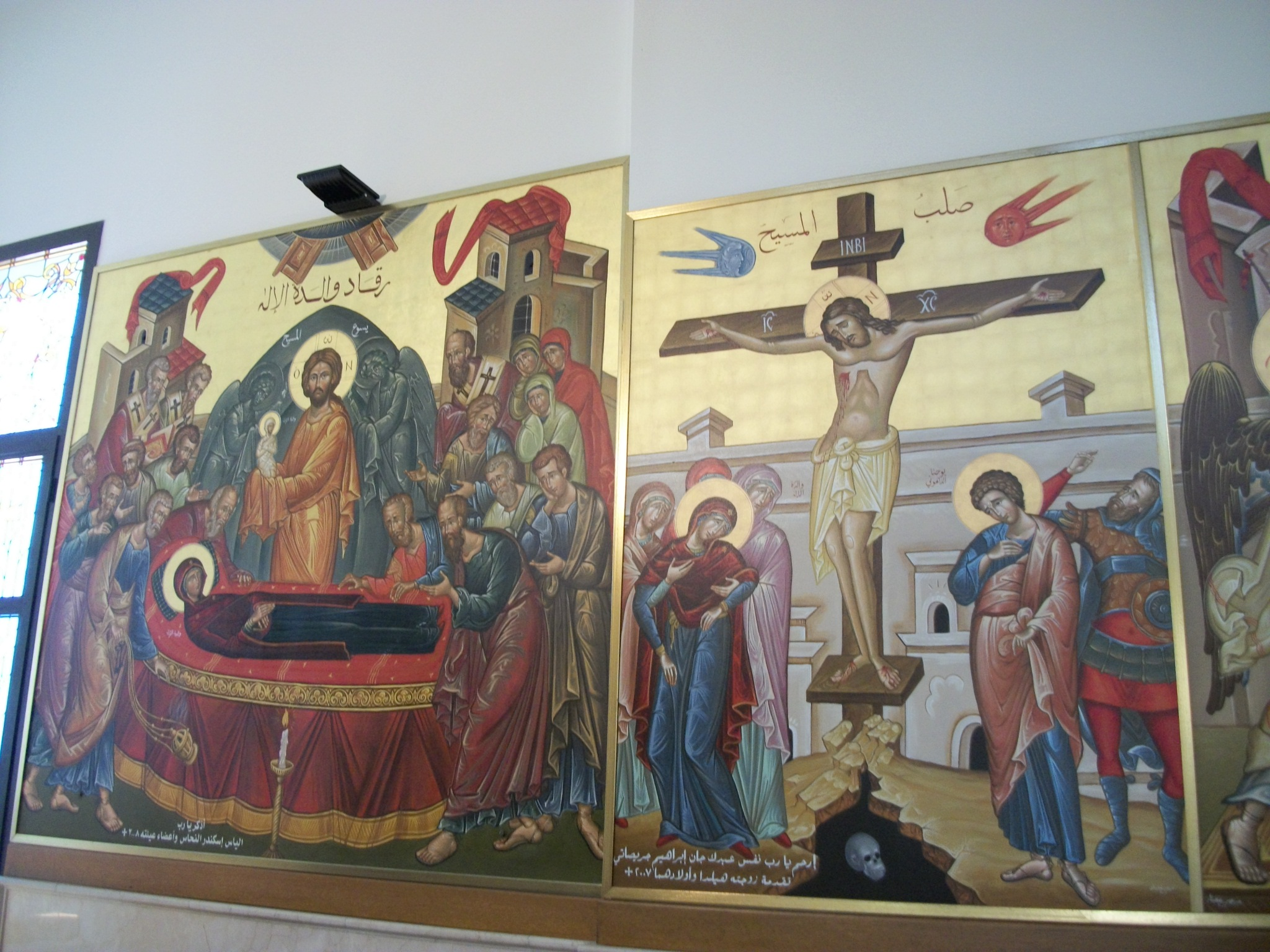
Reading from right to left : the crucifixion of Jesus, The Dormition of the Mother of God

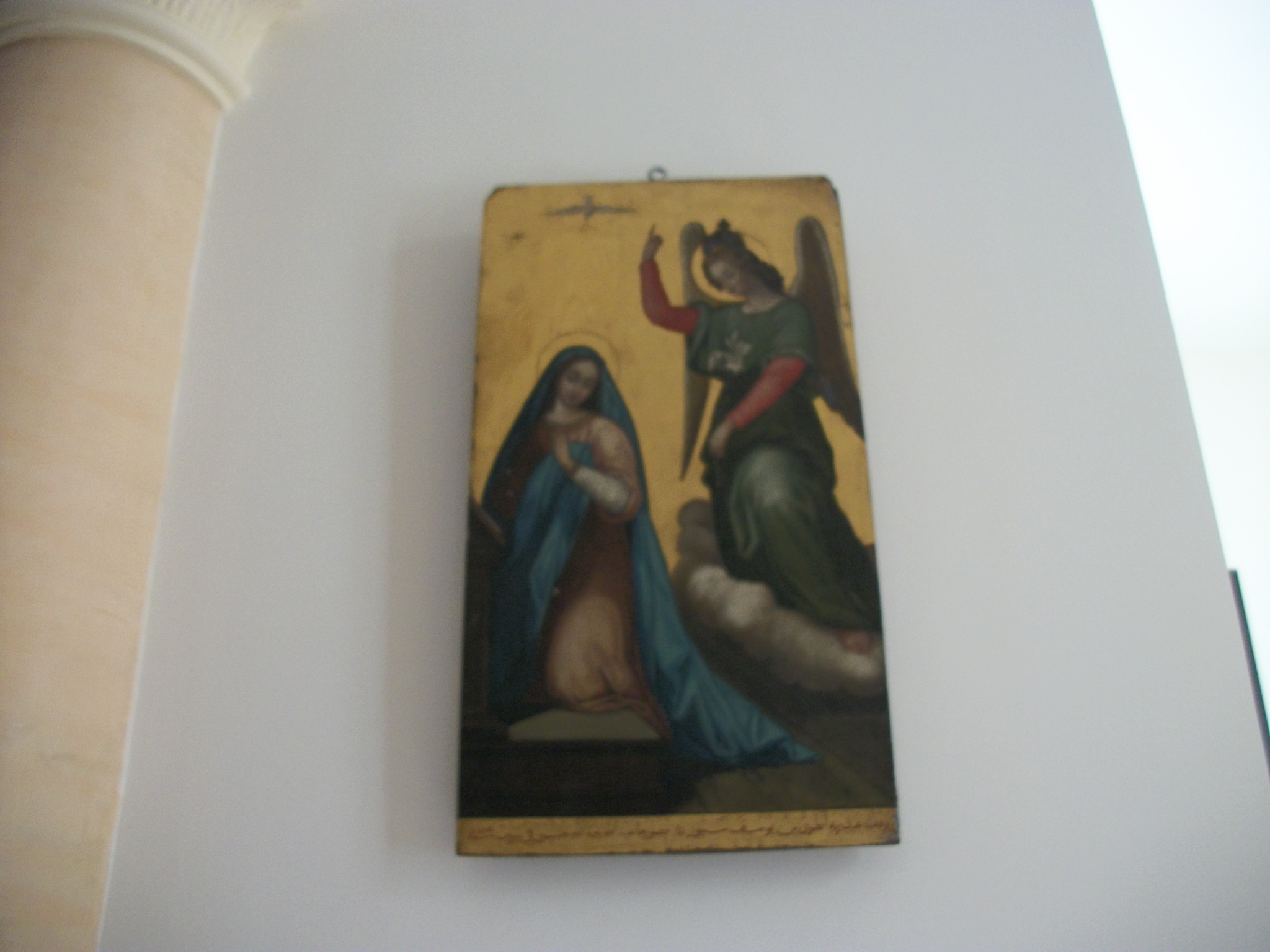
The Annunciation

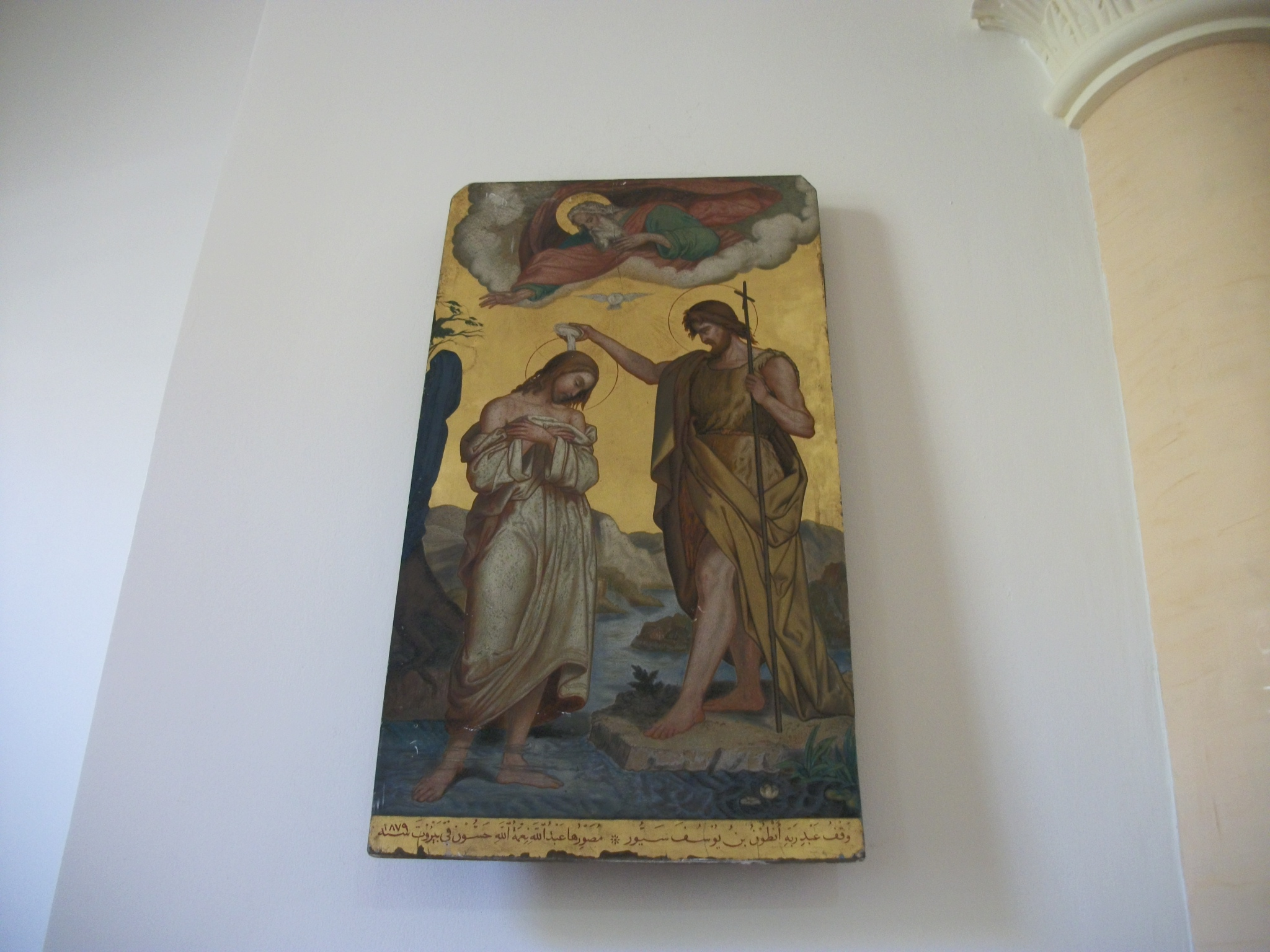
The baptism of Jesus

== List of bishops ==
- Athanasius Dahan, B.C. (1736 appointed - 24 December 1761 confirmed Melkite Patriarch of Antiochia)
- Basil Jelghaf (1763 appointed - 1778 died)
- Ignatius Sarrouf, B.C. (1778 appointed - 21 February 1812 appointed Melkite Patriarch of Antiochia)
- Theodosius Badra, B.C. (1814 appointed - 2 November 1822 died)
- Ignatius Dahan (1822 appointed - 1828 died)
- Agapios Riashi (20 April 1828 confirmed - 1878 died)
- Meletios Fakkak (9 August 1881 appointed - 14 July 1904 died)
- Athanasius Sawoya, B.S. (December 1904 appointed - 6 April 1919 died)
- Basil Cattan (11 February 1921 appointed - 5 August 1933 resigned)
- Maximos Sayegh, S.M.S.P. (30 August 1933 appointed - 21 June 1948 confirmed Melkite Patriarch of Antiochia)
- Philippe Nabaa (17 September 1948 appointed - 11 September 1967 died)
- Grégoire Haddad (9 September 1968 appointed - 19 August 1975 resigned)
- Habib Bacha S.M.S.P. (23 August 1975 appointed - 23 November 1999 died)
- Joseph Kallas, S.M.S.P. (15 January 2000 appointed - 25 May 2010 retired)
- Cyril Salim Bustros, S.M.S.P. (15 June 2011 confirmed - 9 November 2018 retired)
- Georges Wadih Bacouni, S.M.S.P. (24 November 2018 confirmed - )
