= Al-Tawba Mosque (Tripoli) =

Mosque in Tripoli, Lebanon

Al-Tawba mosque
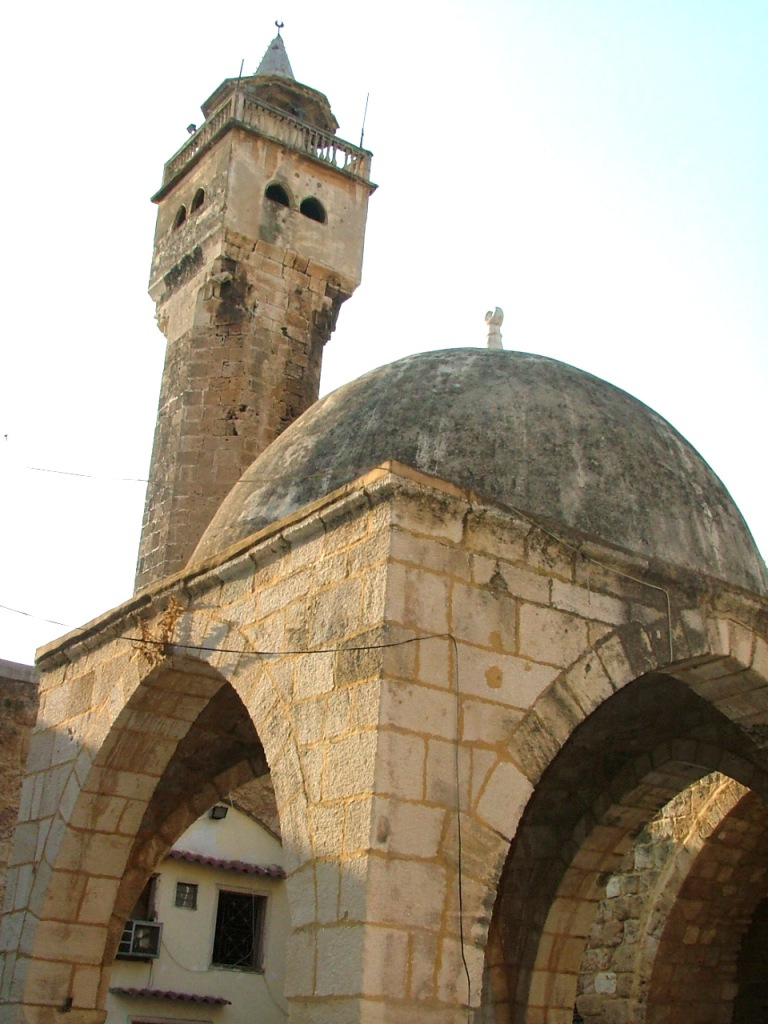
- The mosque minaret and a dome, in 2003

- Location of the mosque in Lebanon

Religion
- Affiliation: Islam
- Ecclesiastical or organisational status: Mosque
- Status: Active

Location
- Location: Tripoli, North Governorate
- Country: Lebanon
- Coordinates: 34°26′16.0″N 35°50′43.4″E

Architecture
- Type: Mosque architecture
- Style: Mamluk architecture
- Established: 1315 AD

Specifications
- Dome: Three
- Minaret: One
- Materials: Stone

The Al-Tawba Mosque is a mosque, located in Tripoli, in the Northern Governorate of Lebanon. The mosque was built in the Mamluk era, during the 14th century.

== History ==
No founding inscription exists, so the exact year of construction is not known. However, it was estimated to have been built during the third reign of Al-Nasir Muhammad.Although a four-line inscription on the wall facing the entrance records a decree of Sultan Shaykh against hoarding and overcharging for food, repeating one in the Great Mosque of Tripoli.

The building was destroyed by a flood that occurred on January 20, 1612. The mosque was restored in June of the same year. An inscription tells about the construction and restoration by Husayn Pasha ibn Yusuf Sayfa, the governor of Tripoli.

== Architecture ==
The outside of the building is not decorated. The structure comprises a minaret in its northwestern corner. On a square base rests an octagonal shaft. On its top is a square balcony.A bronze plaque in the mosque records that the 1612 flood of the Abu Ali River destroyed its walls, minbar, mihrab and ablution fountain. The central arcaded courtyard has a domed fountain on four octagonal pillars, with muqarnas and palm-leaf capitals, and the dome over the main entrance has carved geometric decoration.

The entrance lies below the street level, some steps that are covered by an arch lead down to its door. The central part is the prayer hall that is covered by vaults over which three green domes form its roof. In its center an axial mihrab is flanked by two smaller mihrabs to its sides like in the Mansouri Great Mosque.

== Gallery ==
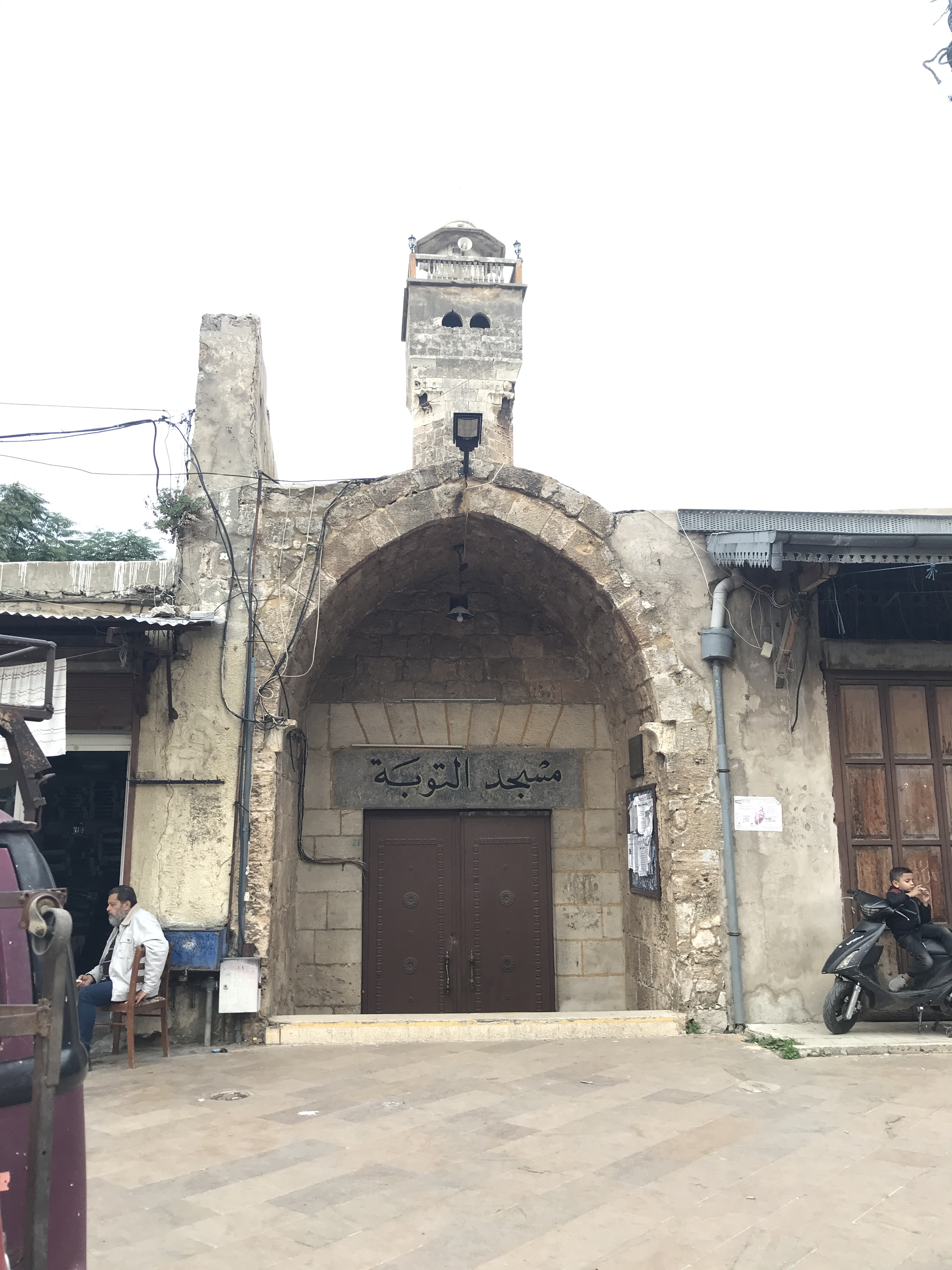
Entrance of the mosque

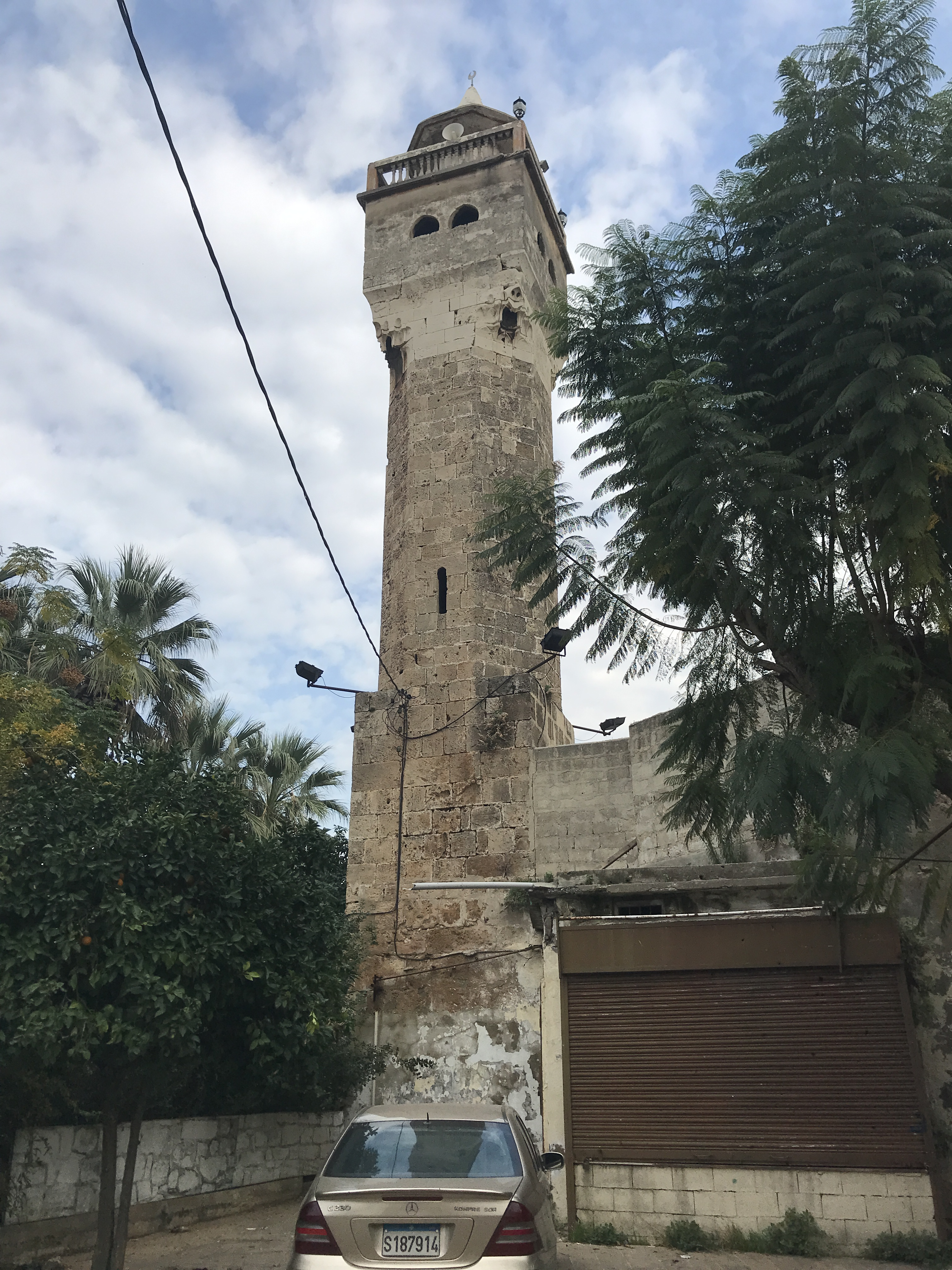
Minaret

The mosque's plaque

== Tripoli landmark map ==
City Centre of Tripoli, Lebanon
Legend
1 Citadel of Tripoli
2 Tripoli Clock Tower
3 Al-Saʼeḥ Library
4 St George Cathedral
5 Al-Tawba Mosque
6 Al-Attar Mosque
7 Al-Burtasi Mosque
8 Al-Uwaysiyat Mosque
9 Abd al-Wahid Mosque
10 Mansouri Great Mosque
11 Mu'allaq Mosque
12 Taynal Mosque

== See also ==
- Islam in Lebanon
- List of mosques in Lebanon
