= Taynal Mosque =

Historic mosque in Tripoli, Lebanon

- Arabic: مسجد طينال
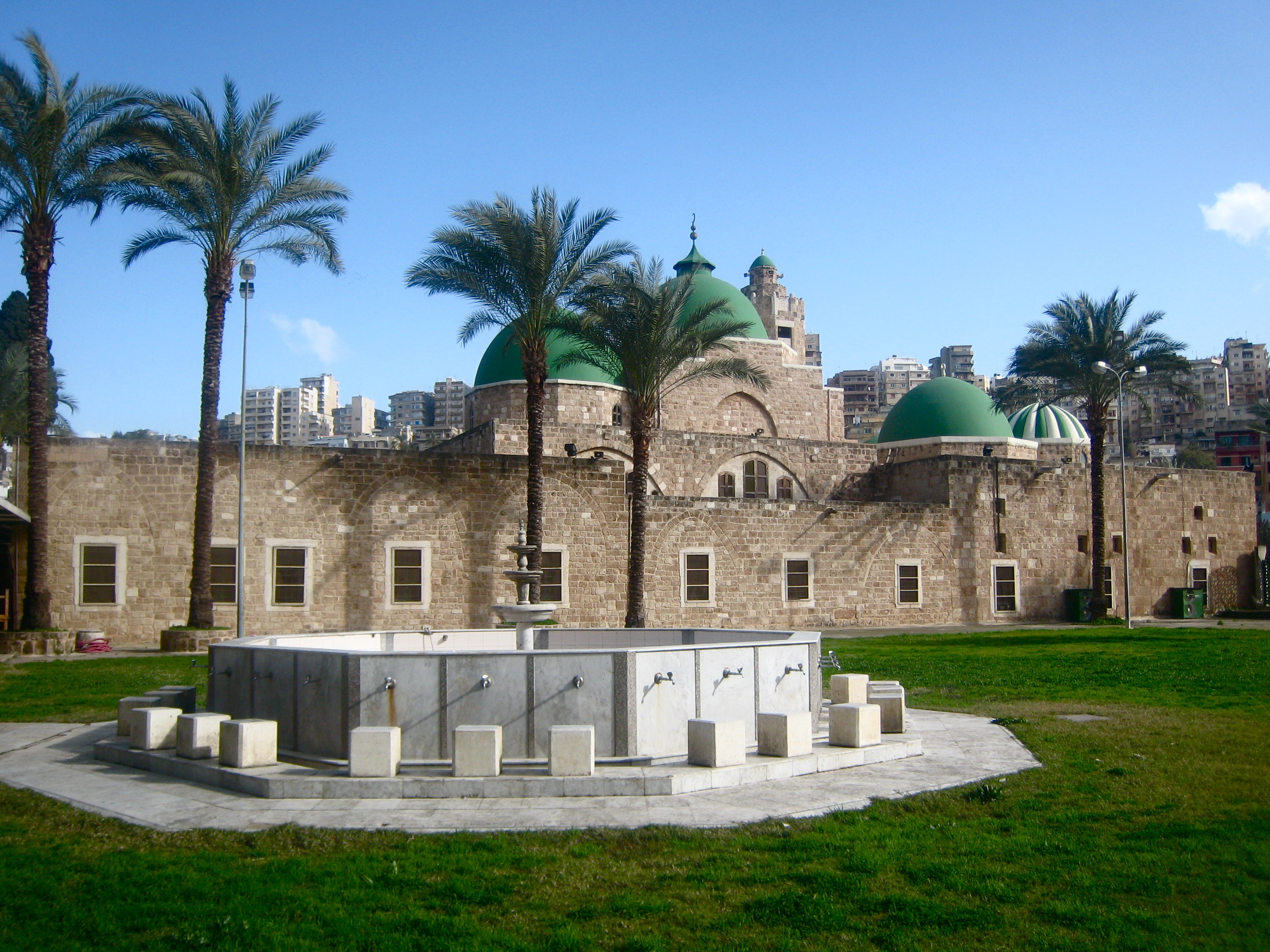
- The mosque in 2009

- Location of the mosque in Lebanon

Religion
- Affiliation: Sunni Islam
- Ecclesiastical or organizational status: Mosque
- Status: Active

Location
- Location: Tripoli
- Country: Lebanon
- Interactive map of Taynal Mosque
- Coordinates: Maps 34°25′51″N 35°50′16″E

Architecture
- Type: Mosque architecture
- Style: Mamluk
- Founder: Taynal
- Completed: 1336

Specifications
- Dome: Three (maybe more)
- Minaret: One

The Taynal Mosque (Arabic: مسجد طينال), also known as the Taylan Mosque, is a historic Sunni Islam mosque, located in Tripoli, Lebanon. It is located on the left bank of the Abu Ali or Kadisha River, in an area of orchards near the Bab al-Raml cemetery. After the Mansouri Great Mosque, it is one of the most important historic and religious monuments in Tripoli.

== History ==
The mosque's construction was ordered by Amir Taynal, the Mamluk governor of the province of Tripoli, who is identified by an inscription near the inner portal of the mosque. His full name in the inscription is given as Sayf al-Din Taynal al-Nasiri. The inscription records the completion of the mosque in February or March 1336 (Rajab 736 AH). Taynal endowed the mosque with a very generous waqf that granted significant revenues for its upkeep. A mausoleum was attached to the mosque, presumably intended for him, but in the end Taynal himself was never buried here.

In 1528, the Shi'ite ruler Muhammad Agha Shu'ayb was assassinated in the mosque by the agents of his rival Emir Mansur Assaf.

The mosque is often noted in historical written accounts by travelers to the city, such as al-Nabulsi in 1700, who noted its lovely appearance but unusual layout. The odd layout and the presence of granite columns with Corinthian capitals has led to theories that it was built on top of an earlier structure, possibly a Carmelite church from the Crusader period which was built in turn over a former Roman temple dedicated to Zeus.

In the 20th century, the mosque served as a shelter for Palestinian refugees for roughly 15 years.

== Architecture ==
The mosque has an unusual layout, consisting of two consecutive halls, with the second one accessed through the first one. The first hall is accessed via a portal with a large pointed arch, inside which is a doorway built in alternating black and white stone, or ablaq. The arched projection may be a later addition that was built in front of the older ablaq portal. Inside, the first hall has a slightly irregular layout divided into three unequal aisles by four columns arranged in a square formation in the middle. The middle aisle, larger than the other two, is covered by two large domes resting on corner squinches, with second dome higher than the first. The floor is made of black and white marble assembled in decorative patterns of the Mamluk era. Some elements in this hall, such as the columns and their Corinthian capitals, may have been part of an older building which was integrated into the Mamluk construction.

The entrance to the second hall is a more ornate portal built entirely in ablaq masonry. It has a recessed form containing panels of geometric decoration and culminating in a muqarnas canopy. The second hall has a square floor plan, with a large sunken square court in the center. This court is covered by a dome supported by four heavy pillars at the corners. Around this area runs a gallery space covered by cross-vaults. In the southern section of this gallery, in the middle, is a smaller but more ornate dome. Past this dome, in the middle of the south wall, is the mihrab (niche symbolizing the direction of prayer). The mihrab itself is very simple, decorated only by two marble colonettes flanking the central niche. Next to it is the wooden minbar (pulpit), which is an excellent work of Mamluk craftsmanship featuring complex geometric motifs. An inscription on the minbar indicates that it was completed in June or July 1336 (Dhu al-Qadah 736 AH) by a master carpenter named Muhammad al-Safadi.

A mausoleum chamber and a minaret are attached to the second section of the mosque. The minaret tower has a slightly unusual form, consisting of a square shaft supporting a slightly wider octagonal section with buttresses. This is topped by a balcony area with small cylindrical turret in the center. The tower's summit can be reached by twin spiral staircases inside, one accessed from inside the mosque and the other from outside.

== Gallery ==
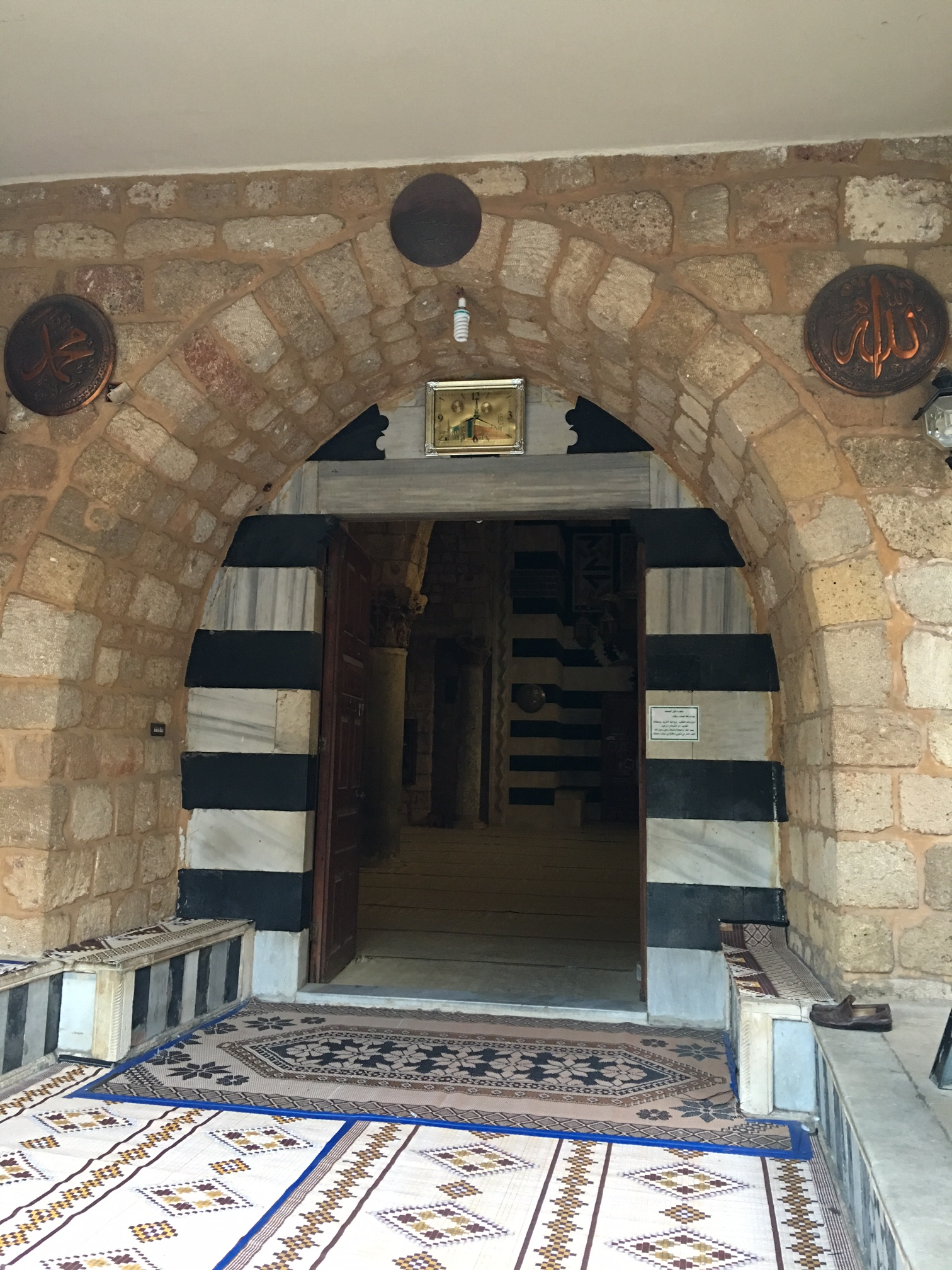
View of mosque's outer entrance

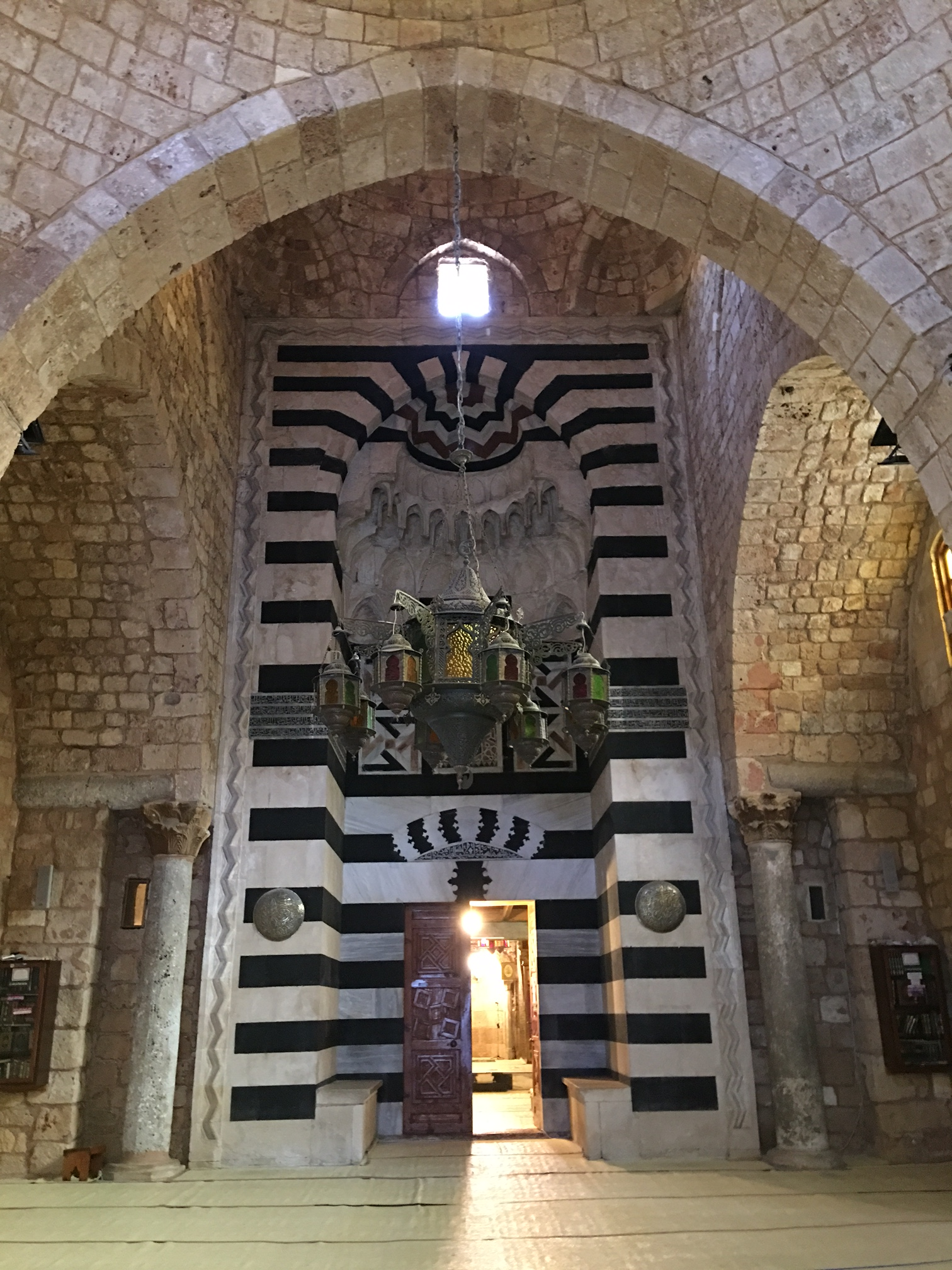
View of the entrance to the mosque's inner chamber

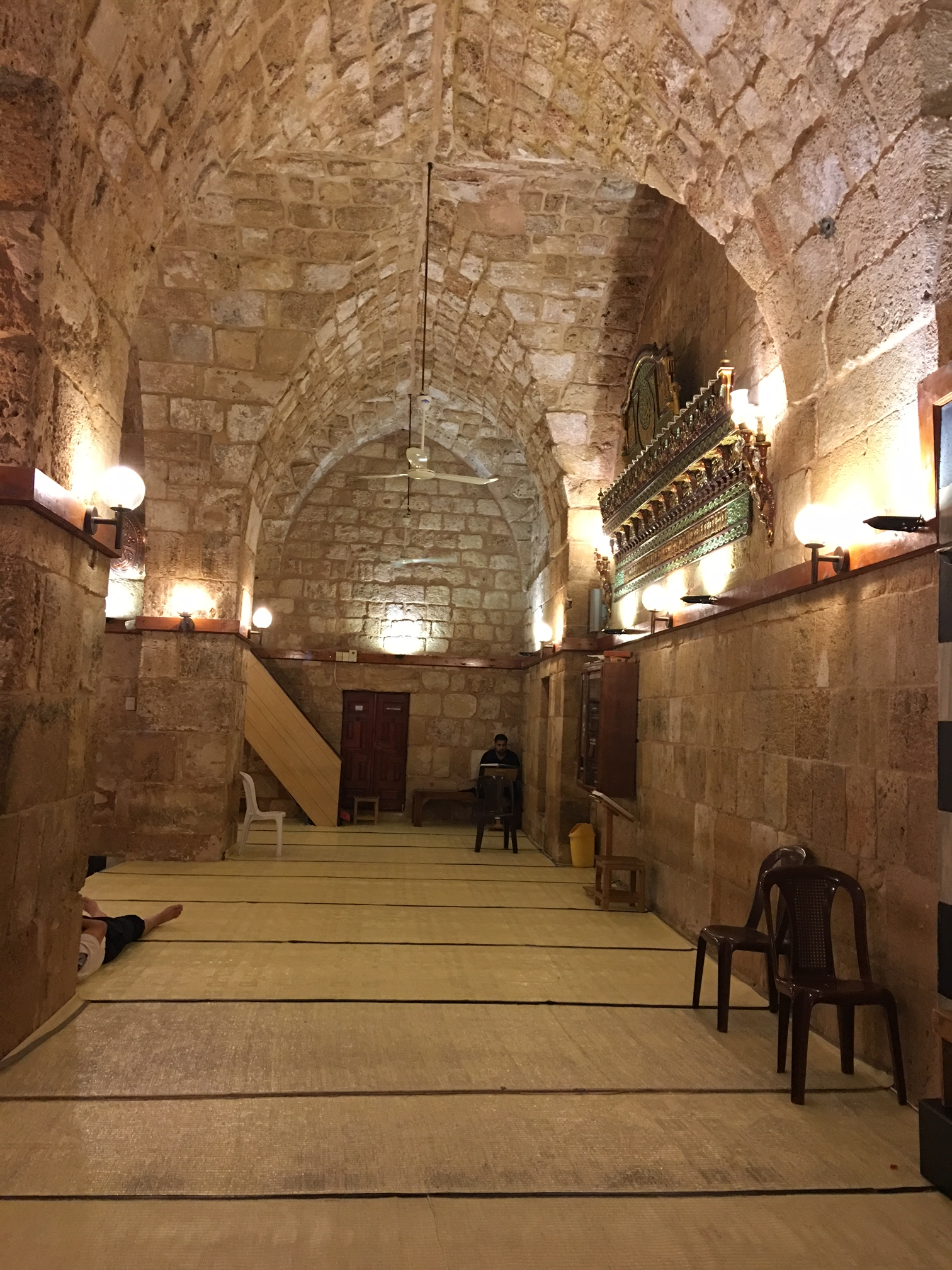
Interior view

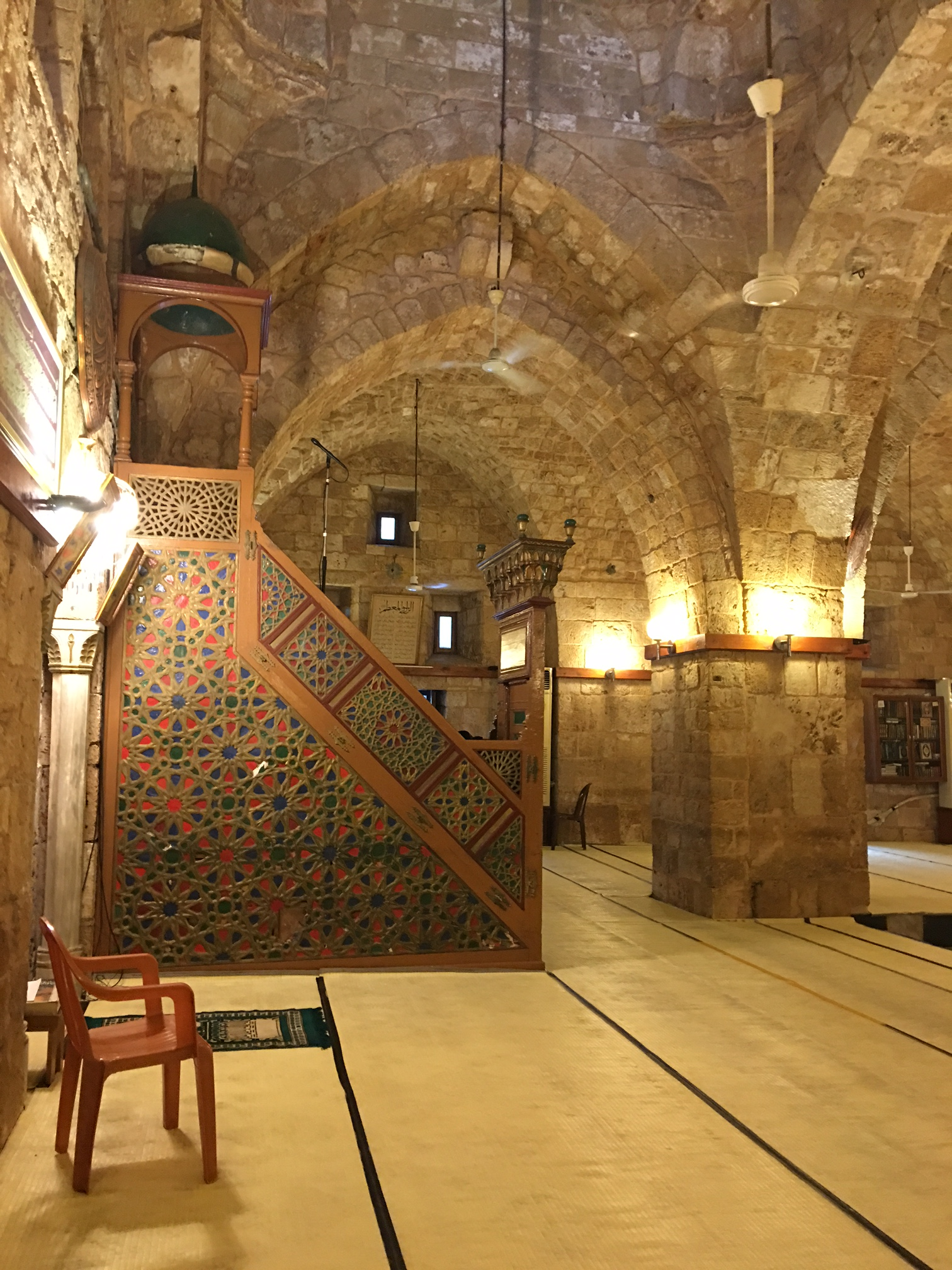
View of the mosque's minbar, next to the mihrab

== Tripoli landmark map ==
City Centre of Tripoli, Lebanon
Legend
1 Citadel of Tripoli
2 Tripoli Clock Tower
3 Al-Saʼeḥ Library
4 St George Cathedral
5 Al-Tawbat Mosque
6 Al-Attar Mosque
7 Al-Burtasi Mosque
8 Al-Uwaysiyat Mosque
9 Abd al-Wahid Mosque
10 Mansouri Great Mosque
11 Mu'allaq Mosque
12 Taynal Mosque

== See also ==
- Islam in Lebanon
- List of mosques in Lebanon
