= Al-Saʼeḥ Library =

Coordinates: 34.43567°N 35.84207°E

The Al-Saʼeḥ Library (مكتبة السائح) is a library founded in 1970 and located in Tripoli, Lebanon by Reverent Ibrahim Sarouj, Priest of the Orthodox parish. It held about 80,000 books and manuscripts. The library collection is diverse with regards to languages (Arabic, Italian, English, French text books), content (Literary, science, Christian and Muslim theology books and manuscripts), and publishing historical periods.

In January 2014, around 40% of the collection was deliberately burnt by unknown Islamist extremists.

Following the incident ‘youths from all sects in Tripoli launch a campaign titled "Kafana Samtan" (Enough Silence), followed up by a Zoomaal campaign that collected about $33,000 for the restoration and modernisation of the library'.

Reverent Sarouj commented on the campaign by saying :

"While many tried to portray a stereotypical image of Tripoli, depicting it as an incubator for terrorism that rejects sectarian diversity, Tripoli's civil society proved its openness and preserved Tripoli's image as a civilised, inclusive [city], a model of coexistence”.

The library was reopened in an official ceremony on 3 January 2015.

== Tripoli landmark map ==
City Centre of Tripoli, Lebanon
Legend
1 Citadel of Tripoli
2 Tripoli Clock Tower
3 Al-Saʼeḥ Library
4 St George Cathedral
5 Al-Tawbat Mosque
6 Al-Attar Mosque
7 Al-Burtasi Mosque
8 Al-Uwaysiyat Mosque
9 Abd al-Wahid Mosque
10 Mansouri Great Mosque
11 Mu'allaq Mosque
12 Taynal Mosque

== See also ==
- List of libraries in Lebanon
- List of destroyed libraries
