= Al-Attar Mosque =

Mosque in Tripoli, Lebanon

- Arabic: مسجد العطار
- Location of the mosque in Lebanon

Religion
- Affiliation: Sunni Islam
- Ecclesiastical or organisational status: Mosque (since 1350); Church (c. 11th century)
- Status: Active

Location
- Location: Bab al-Hadeed, Tripoli, Northern Governorate
- Country: Lebanon
- Coordinates: 34°26′11.4″N 35°50′43.4″E

Architecture
- Architects: Abu Bakr ibn al-Basis; Muhammad ibn Ibrahim
- Type: Mosque architecture
- Style: Mamluk
- Completed: 1350 (as a mosque)

Specifications
- Dome: One
- Minaret: One
- Inscriptions: Three
- Materials: Stone; marble

The Al-Attar Mosque (Arabic: مسجد العطار) is a Sunni Islam congregational mosque (jāmiʿ), located at Bab al-Hadeed, in the Old City of Tripoli, in the Northern Governorate of Lebanon. The mosque was built in 1350 C.E. during the Mamluk period.

The mosque is widely noted for its unusual layout, its interior bears no resemblance to any other known mosque types, and for its square-shaped minaret, an integral part of the skyline of Tripoli and the tallest Mamluk minaret in the city. As of 2022, the site was subject to ongoing archaeological excavations, while still functioning as an active place of worship for the Sunni Muslim population and as a tourist destination.

== History ==
The history of Al-Attar Mosque is contested, however it is largely believed that the mosque was formerly the place of a Crusader church, an assertion first made by a scholar named Abd al-Ghani al-Nabulsi in his travelogue Al-Rihlah al-Tarabulusiyah. The exact nature of transformation from church to mosque is theorized in multiple capacities. One hypothesis states that the mosque was built on the ruins of a destroyed church, while another believes that a surviving Crusader church structure was merely converted to a mosque, yet another hypothesis believes the structure was never a church at all and began its life at a mosque. Regardless of its potential church history, the story of the structure as a mosque began in the 14th century. An inscription within the mosque dates its creation as 1350 CE The mosque's foundation is believed to have been through an endowment (a waqf khayri) by a wealthy perfume merchant tied to the name “al-Attar.” Though the mosque is often called the Perfumers Mosque, it was not associated with the corporation of perfumers. The founder is also thought to be a non-Mamluck, making Al-Attar the first non-Mamluck mosque in Tripoli. The mosque went through multiple alterations and renovations after its foundational date and it was the first mosque in Lebanon to undergo scientific excavations.

== Architecture ==
There are three entrances (portals) to the mosque, the east entrance, which is the main entrance, the western entrance, and the north entrance. The core of the structure is the main prayer hall (situated south to north) with a barrel vault that leads to a dome structure. There is a vestibule leading into the prayer hall from the eastern entrance and an ablution room to the north of that. The qiblah wall borders the main prayer hall in the south, with the minbar in the center and the mihrab to the east. The minaret is situated in the north.

=== Construction ===
There are two main architects attributed to the construction of the mosque whose names are inscribed within the building. One is Abu Bakr ibn al-Basis, a well known architect of the time, and the other is Muhammad ibn Ibrahim, an unknown architect who is written to have been responsible for the main eastern portal and minbar. The inscription, a line of naskh script, reads:

"In the name of God the Merciful, the Compassionate, this blessed door and the minbar are the work of master Muhammad ibn Ibrahim the architect, in the year seven hundred and fifty-one." [1350 CE].

Another inscription, located 2 m (6 ft 7 in) above the ground in the bay of the main portal, also in naskh script, reads:

"On the date of the first tenth of Rabi al-awwal of the year eight hundred and twenty-one [April 8–17, 1418], the royal edict of Sultan al-Malik al-Muayyad Abu al-Nasr Shaykh arrived which decreed that nothing should be levied from the inhabitants of the waqf of Jami al-Attar by the inspectors; that there should be no auctions and no injustices; that the requests of those praying may be granted. Those who comply would be compensated, and those who oppose would draw upon themselves the anger of God and the maledictions of all angels and all men. Amen."

The construction of the mosque is broken up into three distinct sections that occurred at three different times. The oldest section of the mosque is the southern section, the northern section was constructed in a second phase, and then finally a third phase consisted of adding the ablution room, vestibule, and the adjoining eastern room.

A third inscription is on a muqarnas decoration above the lintel of a door on the western side of the mosque. Written in a primitive script, it reads:

"This is the work of Abu Bakr ibn al-Basis, may God have mercy on him."

=== Style and significance ===
The mosque blends in with its surroundings. The three entrances are direct extensions of three roads, with the dome of the mosque being where these three major streets would intersect. This layout asserts the mosque as meeting place for, and extension of the surrounding community.

Notable exterior structures are the grand and richly decorated eastern portal which is made from light and dark-colored alternating stone with stone molding, decorative ablaq, a square plaque of polychrome marble, and a crowning muqarnas niche. Another is the towering square-shaped minaret that is made out of sandstone.

In the interior, the minbar in the center is a built-in white marble structure. The mihbar sits off-center on the qiblah wall. This layout is extremely uncommon in mosque construction. The odd configuration of these interior components has been the main cause of speculation surrounding the mosque's history and potential previous usage as a church.

== Tripoli landmark map ==
City Centre of Tripoli, Lebanon
Legend
1 Citadel of Tripoli
2 Tripoli Clock Tower
3 Al-Saʼeḥ Library
4 St George Cathedral
5 Al-Tawba Mosque
6 Al-Attar Mosque
7 Al-Burtasi Mosque
8 Al-Uwaysiyat Mosque
9 Abd al-Wahid Mosque
10 Mansouri Great Mosque
11 Mu'allaq Mosque
12 Taynal Mosque

== See also ==
- Islam in Lebanon
- List of mosques in Lebanon

== Additional reading ==
- Salam-Liebich, Hayat (1983). The Architecture of the Mamluk City of Tripoli. Cambridge: The Aga Khan Program for Islamic Architecture.
- Meinecke, Michael (1992). Die Mamlukische Architektur in Ägypten und Syrien (648/1250 bis 923/1517) (in German). Glückstadt: Verlag J. J. Augustin, I/76, II/165.
