= Al-Burtasi Mosque =

Mosque in Tripoli, Lebanon

- Arabic: مسجد البرطاسي
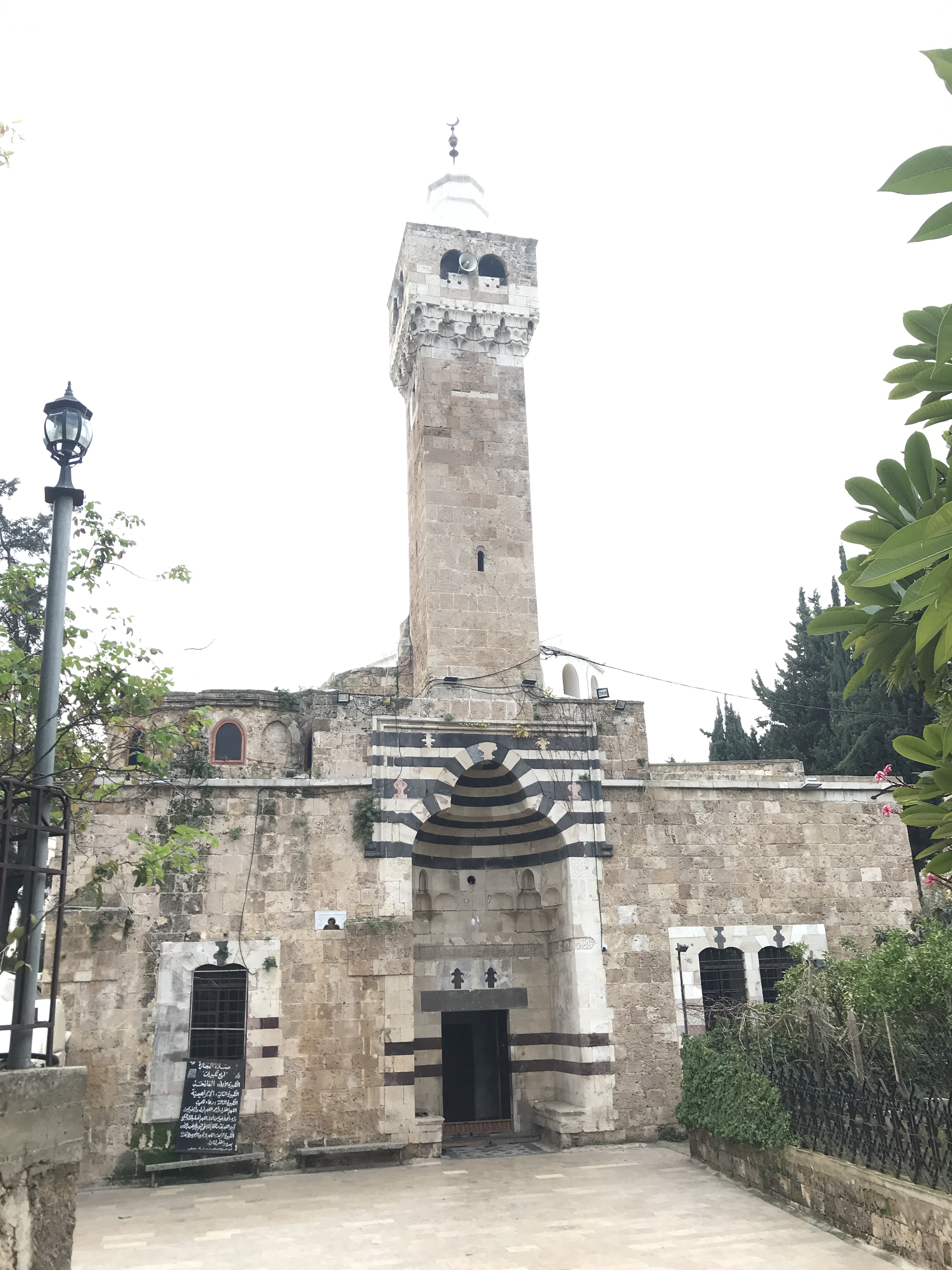
- The mosque entrance in 2022

- Location of the mosque in Lebanon

Religion
- Affiliation: Islam
- Ecclesiastical or organizational status: Mosque
- Status: Active

Location
- Location: Tripoli, North Governorate
- Country: Lebanon
- Interactive map of Al-Burtasi Mosque
- Coordinates: 34°26′08.5″N 35°50′46.5″E

Architecture
- Type: Mosque architecture
- Style: Mamluk
- Established: 1324

Specifications
- Dome: Three
- Minaret: One
- Materials: Stone; marble; glass

The Al-Burtasi Mosque (Arabic: مسجد البرطاسي) is a mosque, located in Tripoli, in the Northern Governorate of Lebanon. The Burtasi mosque is considered one of the most beautiful Mamluk mosques in Tripoli. It is distinguished by its minaret and by its dark stone front decorated by black lines and white ornamentation.

== History ==
The inscription on the main gate does not provide the date of its construction. The mosque was built between 1290–1324.

The minaret and three domes are distinguishing features of the mosque.

The qibla wall is lined with marble, with the mihrab in the center. The mihrab is decorated with glass mosaic, which is rare for mosques in Tripoli. In front of a golden background, a goblet is shown that holds green acanthus.

== Tripoli landmark map ==
City Centre of Tripoli, Lebanon
Legend
1 Citadel of Tripoli
2 Tripoli Clock Tower
3 Al-Saʼeḥ Library
4 St George Cathedral
5 Al-Tawbat Mosque
6 Al-Attar Mosque
7 Al-Burtasi Mosque
8 Al-Uwaysiyat Mosque
9 Abd al-Wahid Mosque
10 Mansouri Great Mosque
11 Mu'allaq Mosque
12 Taynal Mosque

== See also ==
- Islam in Lebanon
- List of mosques in Lebanon
