= Archeparchy of Tripoli =

Archeparchy of Tripoli may refer to:

- Melkite Greek Catholic Archeparchy of Tripoli
- Maronite Catholic Archeparchy of Tripoli
