= List of mosques in Lebanon =

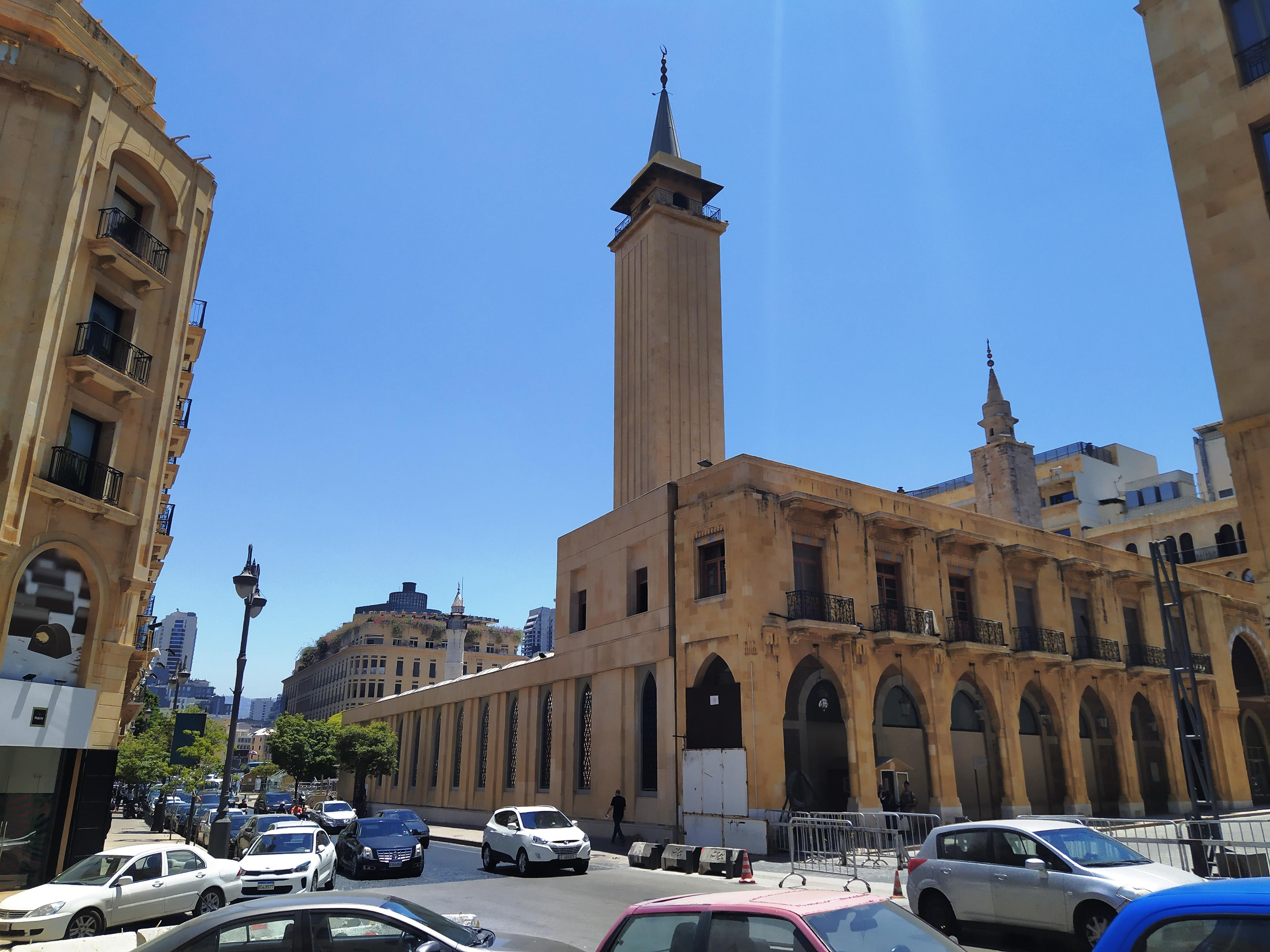
Al Omari Mosque, Beirut

This is a list of mosques in Lebanon, divided by mosques in different cities. Muslims form a significant community in Lebanon. Lebanese Muslims are primarily Sunnis and Shias, followed by smaller groups such as Alwaites and Ismai'ilis. A survey by the conducted by Information International shows that there are 1,502 mosques in Lebanon.

== Beirut ==
Name	Images	Location	Year/century	Remarks
Al-Khodr Mosque		Beirut	Byzantine era-1661	Former church on the site where St. George slew a dragon that became a mosque in the 17th century
Al-Omari Grand Mosque		Beirut	7th-12th cent. again from 1291-now	Originally a Roman temple that became a church and then a mosque, a church again in the 12th century, and again a mosque in the 13th century
Emir Assaf Mosque		Beirut	1597	Built on the site of the Byzantine Church of the Holy Savior
Emir Munzer Mosque		Beirut	1616-1633	
Sanayeh Mosque		Beirut		
Al-Majidiyyeh Mosque		Beirut	19th Century	Originally a fort
Sultan Muhammad Al-Fatih Mosque		Beirut	1998	
Mohammad Al-Amin Mosque		Beirut	2008	

== Tripoli ==
Name	Images	Location	Year/century	Remarks
Mansouri Great Mosque		Tripoli	1314	
Taynal Mosque		Tripoli	1336	
Al-Attar Mosque		Tripoli	1350	
Al-Burtasi Mosque		Tripoli	before 1381	
Al-Tawbat Mosque		Tripoli	14th century	
Al-Uwaysiyat Mosque		Tripoli	1461	

== Other places ==
Name	Images	Location	Year/century	Remarks
Umayyad Mosque of Baalbek		Baalbek	714-715	the mosque was rebuilt between 1996 and 1998
Maqam Shamoun Al Safa		Shamaa	1097	
Fakhreddine Mosque		Deir el Qamar	1493	The oldest mosque in Mount Lebanon.

== See also ==
- Lists of mosques
- Islam in Lebanon
