= Al-Omari Grand Mosque =

Mosque in Beirut, Lebanon

- Arabic: المسجد العمري الكبير
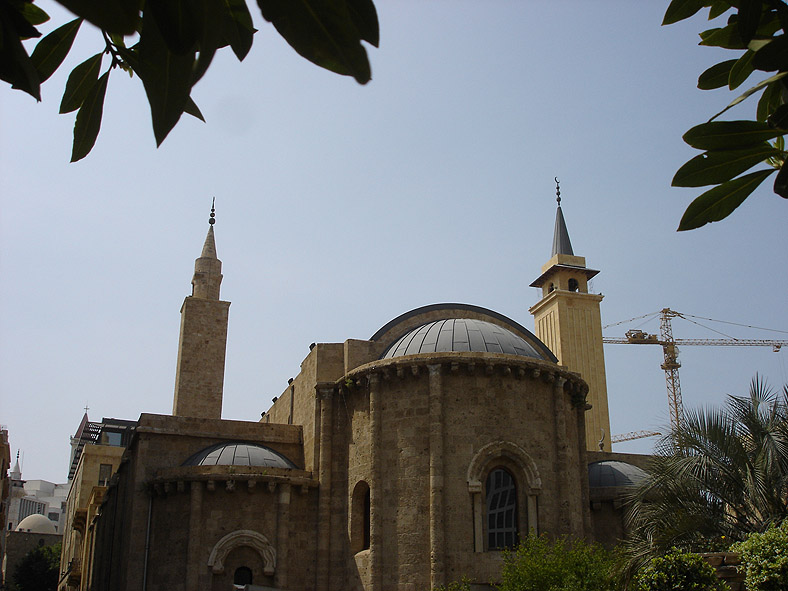
- The mosque in 2008

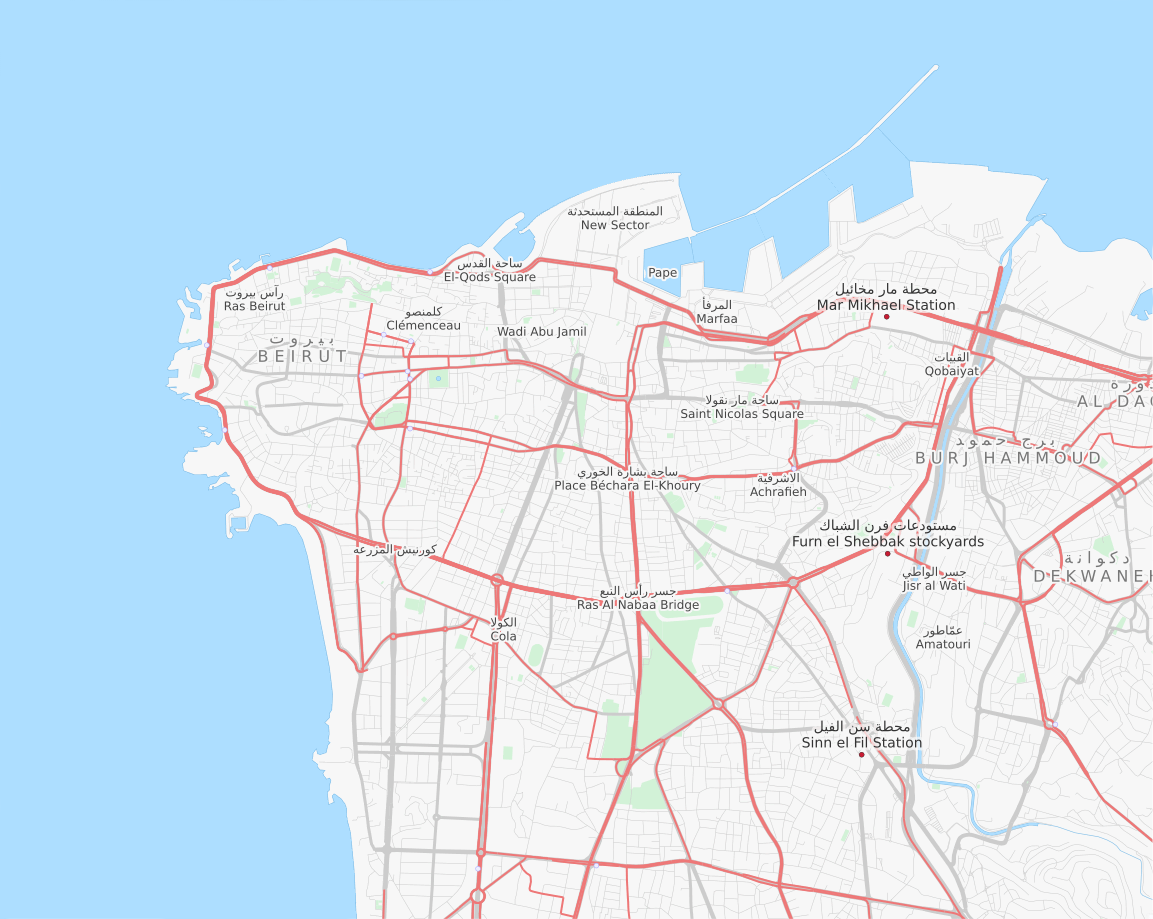
- Location of the mosque in Beirut

Religion
- Affiliation: Sunni Islam
- Ecclesiastical or organizational status: Roman temple; Byzantine Basilica; Mosque (7th cent.); Church (12th cent. Crusader era); Mosque (13th cent. - since 1291)
- Status: Active

Location
- Location: Central District, Beirut
- Country: Lebanon
- Interactive map of Al-Omari Grand Mosque
- Coordinates: 33°53′51″N 35°30′19″E

Architecture
- Architect: Youssef Haidar (2004)
- Type: Church architecture; Mosque architecture
- Style: Ancient Roman; Byzantine; Romanesque; Mamluk
- Established: 1291 (as an Islamic community)
- Groundbreaking: 1113 (as a church)
- Completed: 1115 (as a church); 1291 (as a mosque)

Specifications
- Dome: Three (estimate)
- Minaret: Two

The Al-Omari Grand Mosque (Arabic: المسجد العمري الكبير), known as Jami' Al-Kabir, is a Sunni Islam mosque, located in the central district of Beirut, in Lebanon.

The building has been a place of worship including its original use as a Roman temple, and subsequently as a Roman church during the Byzantine era, it was re-built in 635 ACE during the reign of Islam's second caliph, Umar Bin El Khattab and named in his honor, this mosque was eventually conquered and converted into a Crusader church, before Beirut was conquered by Mamluk Egypt and it was re-converted into a mosque.

== History ==
The Al-Omari Grand Mosque was originally a Roman temple, dedicated to the god Jupiter. The Ancient Roman influence is visible in some of the architectural elements, including the building's columns and foundations.

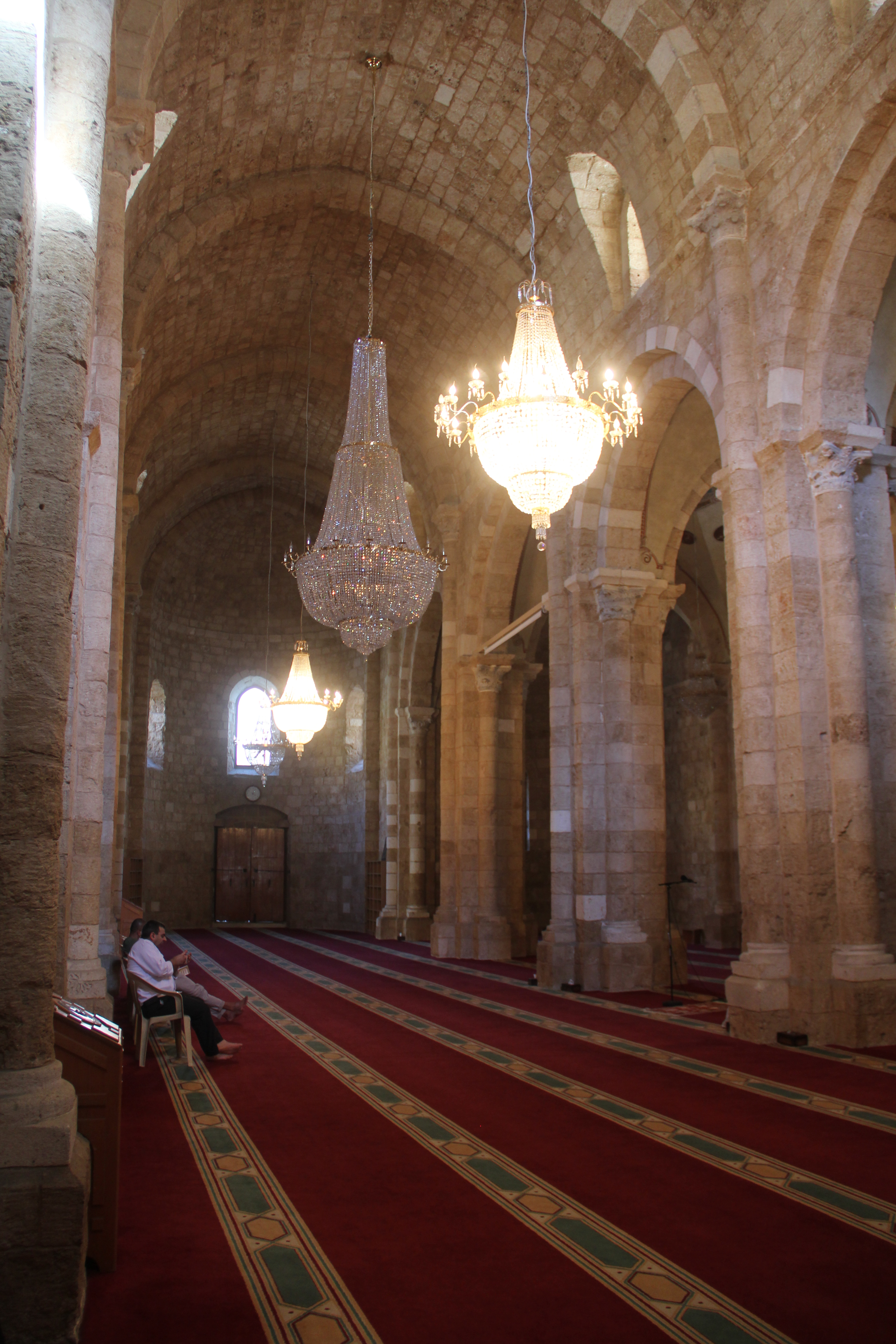
Al-Omari Grand Mosque interior

During the Byzantine era, the building was made into a Roman basilica that featured intricate mosaics and architectural elements of the Byzantine style. In the 7th century CE, the basilica was converted into a mosque. During the Crusader occupation of Beirut, in the 12th century, the mosque was converted into the Church of Saint John. Similar Romanesque churches with triple apses were built in Tyre and Tartus, using recuperated material such as Roman columns and capitals.

In 1291, the Mamluks captured Beirut from the last crusader states (1099–1291), and under Islamic conquest the church was again converted into a mosque. It was renamed Al-Omari Mosque after the second caliph, and became known as "Jami' Al-Kabir", or the Great Mosque. Its Mamluk-style entrance and domes and minarets were added in 1350, reflecting traces of the former church's Byzantine style.

Badly damaged during the Lebanese Civil War, the mosque's refurbishment was completed in 2004, under the direction of Youssef Haidar.

== Gallery ==
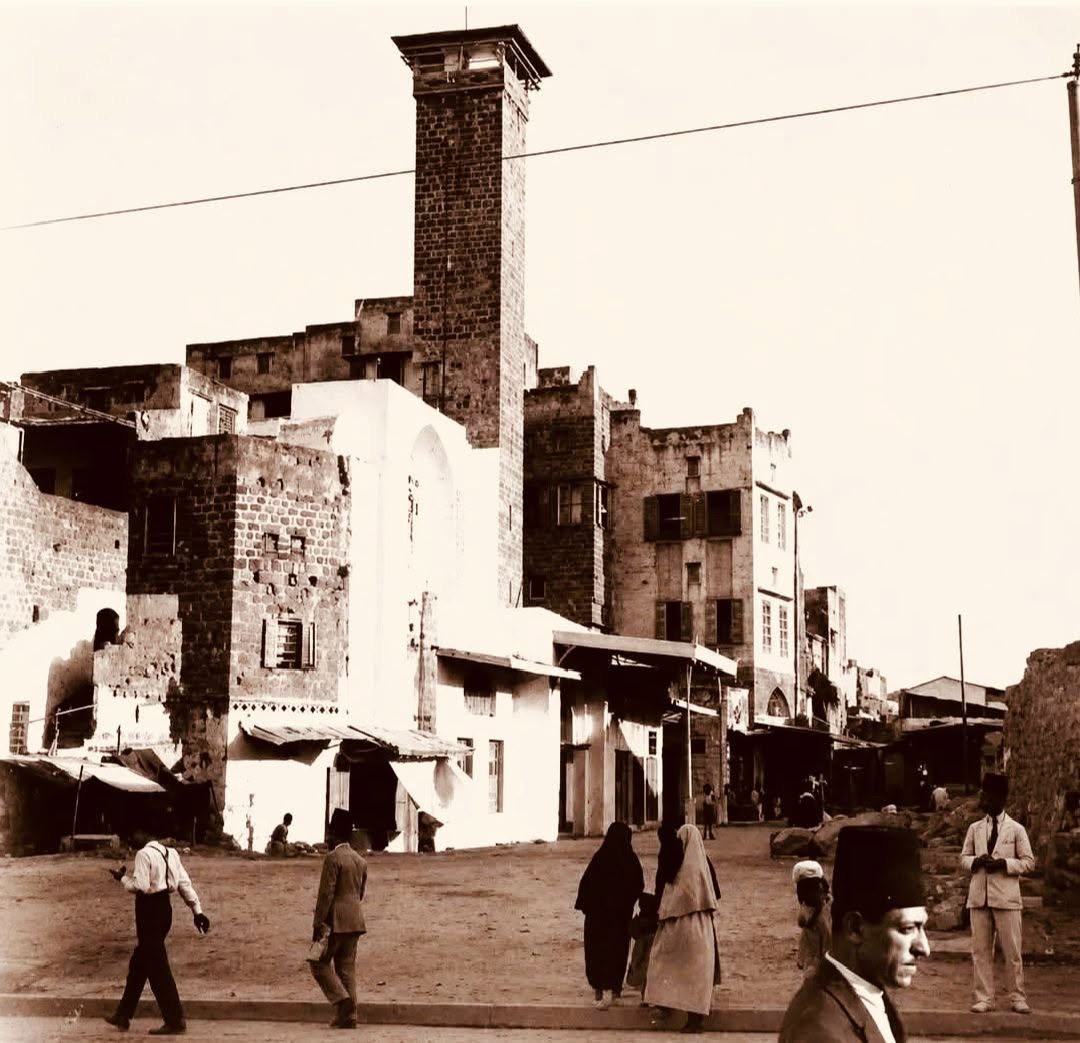
The mosque in 1922

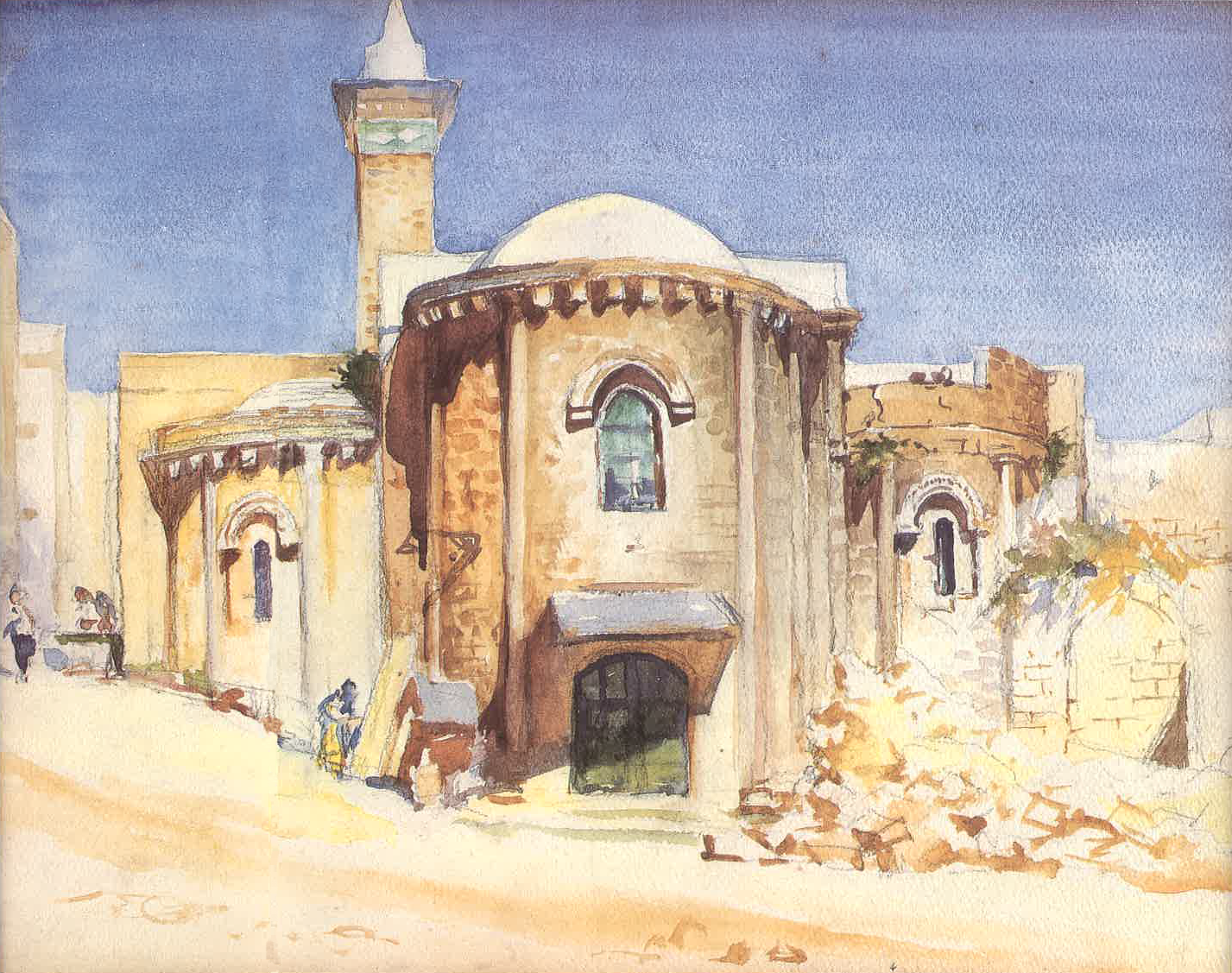
Painting by Moustafa Farroukh, circa 1932

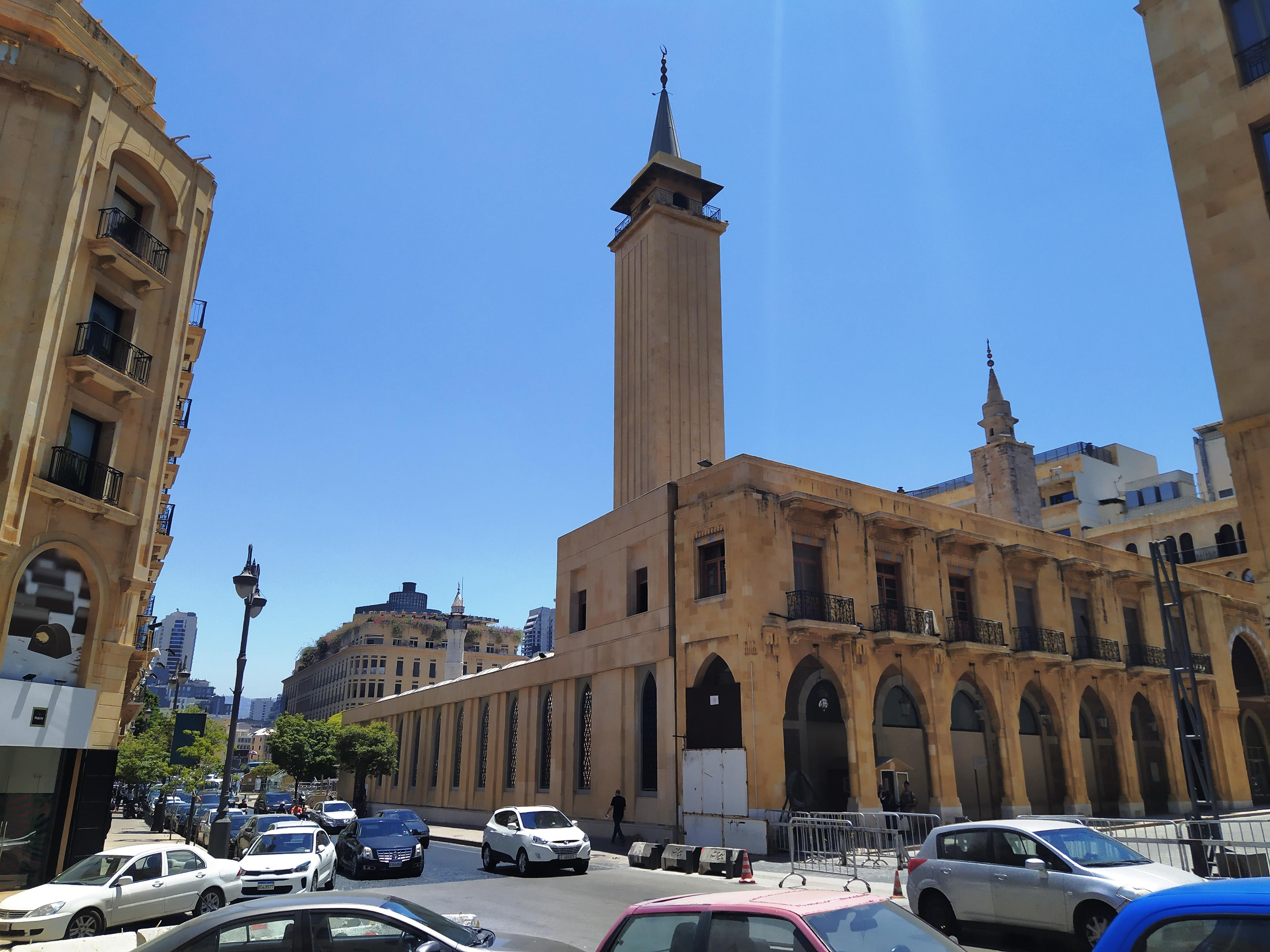
The minarets from Rue Weygand

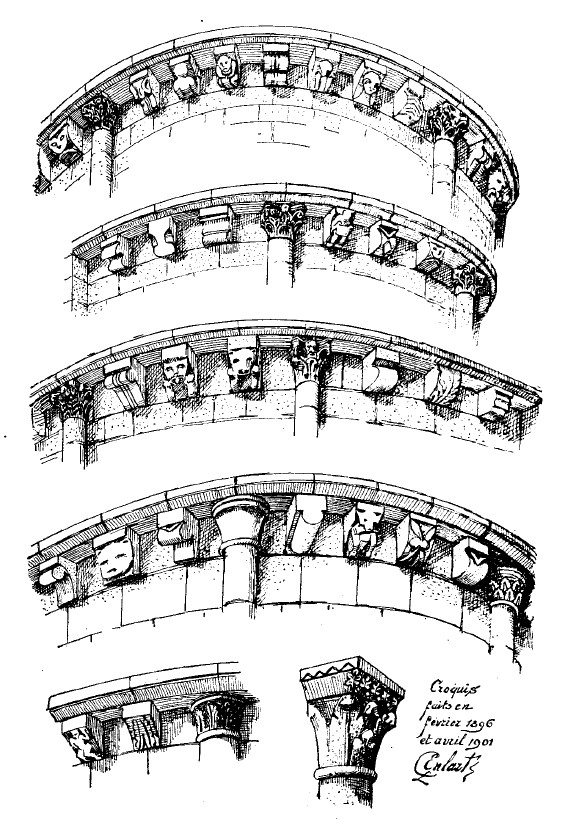
Romanesque elements of the mosque, formerly Saint John cathedral

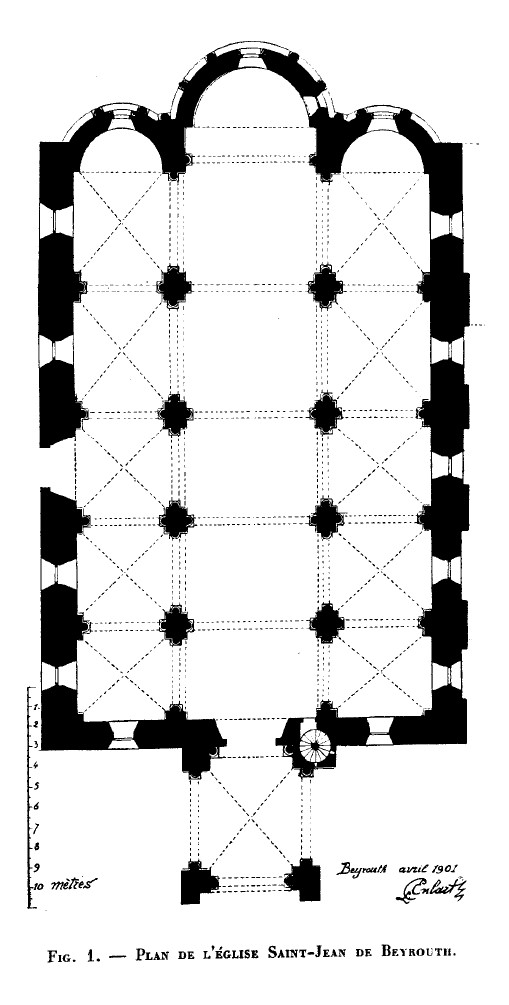
Plan of the mosque

== See also ==
- Islam in Lebanon
- List of mosques in Lebanon
