= Eduard Daher =

Lebanese Catholic archbishop (born 1973)

Eduard Georges Daher B.C.
- Archeparch of Tripoli
- Church: Melkite Greek Catholic Church
- Archdiocese: Archeparchy of Tripoli
- Installed: 9 July 2013
- Predecessor: George Riashi

Orders
- Ordination: 8 May 1999
- Consecration: 7 September 2013 by Gregory III Laham

Personal details
- Born: 23 April 1973 (age 53) Qaa, Beqaa Governorate, Lebanon

Eduard Georges Daher, B.C., (born 23 April 1973 in Qaa, Lebanon) is the current Melkite Greek Catholic Archbishop of the Melkite Greek Catholic Archeparchy of Tripoli.

== Life ==
Eduard Daher entered at the minor seminary of the Basilian Chouerite Order in 1985 and on 28 August 1994 made his perpetual profession vows. He studied Philosophy and Theology at Saint Paul of Harissa and the Holy Spirit University of Kaslik, and later Canon Law at La Sagesse University in Beirut. On 8 May 1999, he received the sacrament of Holy Orders.

The Synod of Bishops of the Melkite Greek Catholic bishops elected him Archbishop of Tripoli. Pope Francis approved his election as Archbishop of Tripoli on 9 July 2013. The Melkite Greek Catholic Patriarch of Antioch, Gregory III Laham, BS, gave him on 7 September of the same year his episcopal ordination. His co-consecrators were the Archbishop of Zahle and Furzol, Issam John Darwich, BS, and the Archbishop of Homs, Jean-Abdo Arbach, BC.
