= Melkite Greek Catholic Archeparchy of Tripoli =

Eastern Catholic archeparchy in Lebanon

Coordinates: 34.4333°N 35.8500°E

Archeparchy of Tripoli (Melkite Greek) Archeparchy Tripolitana Graecorum Melkitarum

Location
- Country: Lebanon

Statistics
- Population: (as of 2010); 10,000
- Parishes: 15

Information
- Denomination: Melkite Greek Catholic Church
- Rite: Byzantine Rite
- Established: 1964
- Cathedral: Saint George Cathedral

Current leadership
- Pope: Leo XIV
- Patriarch: Youssef Absi
- Archeparch: Eduard Daher

Melkite Greek Catholic Archeparchy of Tripoli (in Latin: Archeparchy Tripolitana Graecorum Melkitarum) is a diocese of the Melkite Greek Catholic Church suffragan of the Melkite Greek Catholic Archeparchy of Tyre. It is governed by Archeparch Eduard Daher, BC.

== Territory and statistics ==
The archeparchy extends its jurisdiction over the faithful of the North Governorate in Lebanon. Its archeparchial seat is the city of Tripoli, where is located the cathedral of Saint George, built in 1835.

The territory is divided into 15 parishes and has 10,000 Catholics.

== History ==
The see of Tyre is an ancient one, already known in the fourth century, was restored on 21 March 1897.

On 28 April 1961 it gave a portion of territory for the creation of the Melkite Greek Catholic Archeparchy of Latakia of the Melkites.

On 18 November 1964 it was elevated to the rank of archeparchy.

In 1969 the Holy Synod of the Melkite decided to merge the Batroun District inside the archeparchy, which had been part of the Melkite Greek Catholic Archeparchy of Beirut and Byblos. From this moment the archeparchy covers the entire North Governorate in Lebanon.

== Eparchs ==
- Joseph Duman, BS (March 21, 1897 - December 4, 1922 deceased)
- Joseph Kallas (April 4, 1923 - December 9, 1960 deceased)

== Archeparchs ==
- Augustin Farah (March 7, 1961 - August 25, 1977 appointed archeparch of Zahleh and Furzol)
- Elias Nijmé, BA (February 7, 1978 - August 5, 1995 withdrawn)
- George Riashi, BC (July 28, 1995 - March 3, 2010 withdrawn)
- Vacant (2010-2013)
- Eduard Daher, BC, (since July 9, 2013)

== Tripoli landmark map ==
City Centre of Tripoli, Lebanon
Legend
1 Citadel of Tripoli
2 Tripoli Clock Tower
3 Al-Saʼeḥ Library
4 St George Cathedral
5 Al-Tawbat Mosque
6 Al-Attar Mosque
7 Al-Burtasi Mosque
8 Al-Uwaysiyat Mosque
9 Abd al-Wahid Mosque
10 Mansouri Great Mosque
11 Mu'allaq Mosque
12 Taynal Mosque
