= Elias Nijmé =

Elias Nijmé BA
- Archeparch of Tripoli
- Native name: الياس نجمى
- Church: Melkite Greek Catholic Church
- Archdiocese: Archeparchy of Tripoli
- In office: 7 February 1978 – 5 August 1995
- Predecessor: Augustin Farah
- Successor: George Riashi
- Previous posts: Titular Archeparch of Palmyra (1971-1978)Archeparch "pro hac vice", Auxiliary Eparch of Antioch (1971-1978)

Orders
- Ordination: 20 July 1944
- Consecration: 5 September 1971 by Maximos V Hakim

Personal details
- Born: 16 August 1920 Aleppo, Occupied Enemy Territory Administration, French Empire
- Died: 6 November 1998 (aged 78)

Elias Nijmé, BA (16 August 1920, Aleppo – 6 November 1998) was Archbishop of the Melkite Greek Catholic Archeparchy of Tripoli in Lebanon.

== Auxiliary Bishop of Antioch ==
Elias Nijmé was ordained on 20 July 1944 Chaplain of the Aleppinian Basilian. His appointment as Archbishop "pro hac vice", Auxiliary Bishop in the Melkite Patriarchate of Antioch and Titular Archbishop of Palmyra of Greek Melkites was performed on 16 August 1971, and appointed. On 5 September 1971, Nijmé was consecrated by Patriarch of Antioch Maximos V Hakim and his co-consecrators were Archbishop Athanasios Toutoungi of Aleppo and Archbishop Grégoire Haddad of Beirut and Byblos.

== Archbishop of Tripoli ==
On 7 February 1978 Nijmé was appointed to the Melkite Greek Catholic Archeparchy of Tripoli and served in Tripoli until his age-related retirement on 5 August 1995. He became Archbishop Emeritus until his death on 6 November 1998, and was the consecrator of the Melkite bishop Georges Kahhalé Zouhaïraty, BA, titular bishop of Abila Lysaniae and Apostolic Exarch of Venezuela.
