= Al-Uwaysiyat Mosque =

Mosque in Tripoli, Lebanon

- Arabic: جامع الأويسي
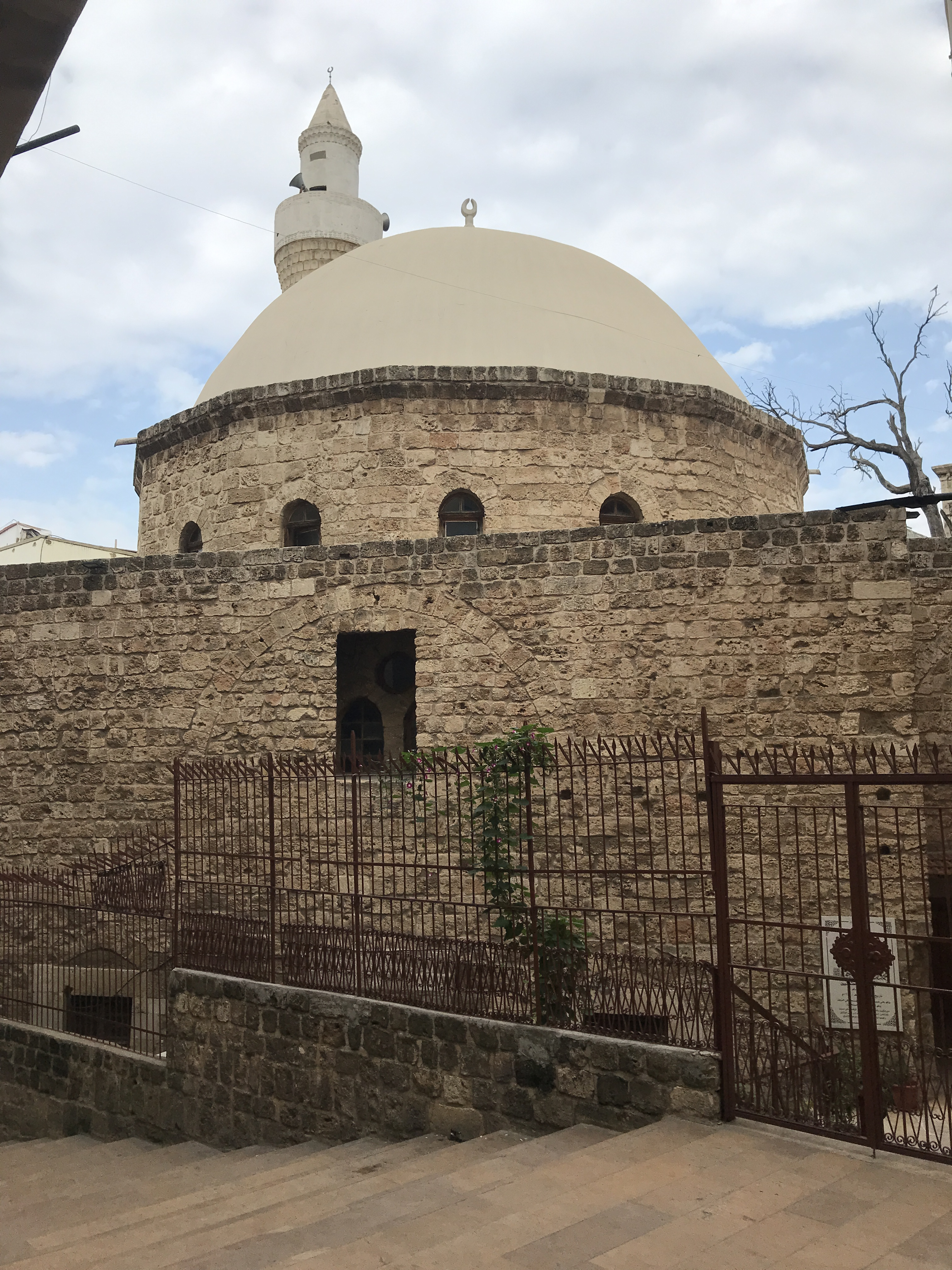
- The mosque in 2002

- Location of the mosque in Lebanon

Religion
- Affiliation: Islam
- Ecclesiastical or organizational status: Mosque
- Status: Active

Location
- Location: Tripoli, Northern Governorate
- Country: Lebanon
- Interactive map of Al-Uwaysiyat Mosque
- Coordinates: 34°26′07.0″N 35°50′41.4″E

Architecture
- Type: Mosque architecture
- Style: Mamluk
- Completed: 1461

Specifications
- Dome: One
- Minaret: One

The Al-Uwaysiyat (Arabic: جامع الأويسي) is a mosque, located in Tripoli, in the Northern Governorate of Lebanon. The mosque was built in 1461 during the Mamluks period.

== History ==
Built in 1461, the mosque was renovated in 1534 during the Ottoman period. The mosque has a large mid-dome and a cylindrical Ottoman minaret.

== Tripoli landmark map ==
City Centre of Tripoli, Lebanon
Legend
1 Citadel of Tripoli
2 Tripoli Clock Tower
3 Al-Saʼeḥ Library
4 St George Cathedral
5 Al-Tawbat Mosque
6 Al-Attar Mosque
7 Al-Burtasi Mosque
8 Al-Uwaysiyat Mosque
9 Abd al-Wahid Mosque
10 Mansouri Great Mosque
11 Mu'allaq Mosque
12 Taynal Mosque
