= Kadisha River =

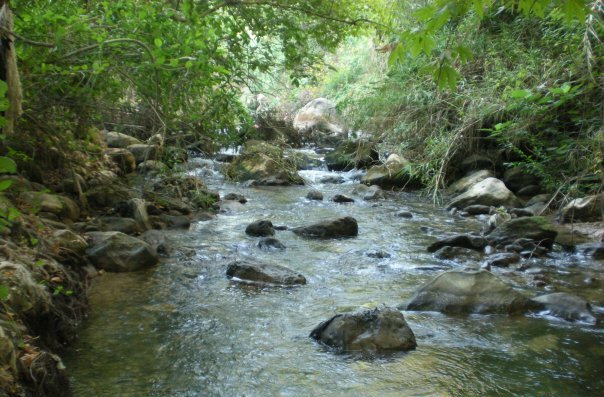
- The river at its upper reaches

Location
- Country: Lebanon

Physical characteristics
- Source
  - location: Qurnat as Sawda', Lebanon
- Mouth
  - location: Mediterranean Sea
  - coordinates: 34°27′28″N 35°50′29″E
- Length: 45 km (28 mi)

The Kadisha River (Arabic: نهر قاديشا, romanized: Nahr Qādīshā) or Abu Ali River (Arabic: نهر أبو علي, romanized: Nahr Abū ‘Alī) is a significant watercourse in northern Lebanon. The river that runs east to west for 45 kilometres (28 mi) originates from springs near the sacred Kadisha Valley, particularly at the base of the Qurnat as Sawda' mountain, the highest peak in Lebanon. In Zgharta, in the Zgharta District the Kadisha river merges with the Rachiine and Jouit river that source from the town of Rachiine and Ehden respectively where it becomes the Abu Ali River that passes through Tripoli, Lebanon.

The Kadisha River has played a vital role in the region’s history, providing water for agriculture and acting as a natural corridor through the rugged terrain. However, it has also faced environmental challenges, including pollution from urban and industrial activities near Tripoli. The river remains an iconic feature of northern Lebanon, symbolizing the interplay of natural and cultural heritage. Walled and partially covered on its passage through Tripoli, the river is very polluted.

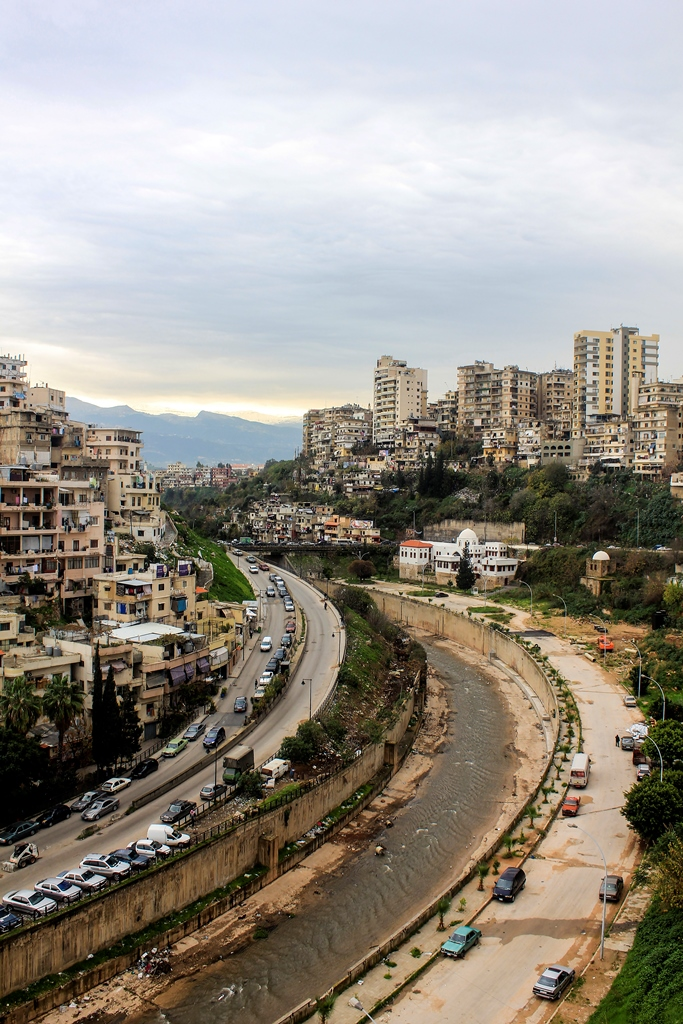
The walled Nahr Abu Ali at Tripoli
