= Mu'allaq Mosque (Tripoli) =

Mosque in Tripoli, Lebanon

- Arabic: المسجد المعلق
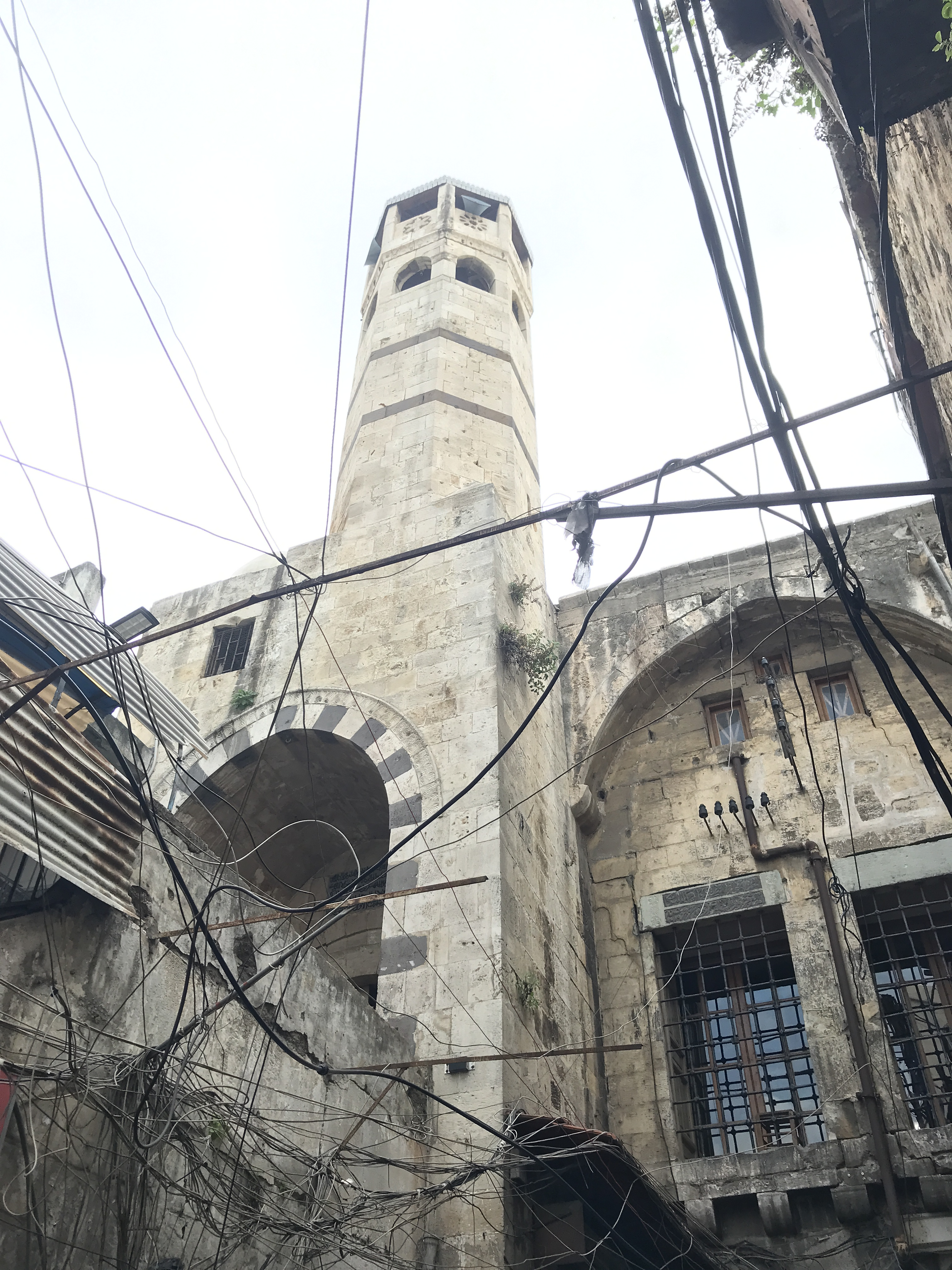
- View from northeast with the minaret

- Location of the mosque in Lebanon

Religion
- Affiliation: Islam
- Ecclesiastical or organizational status: Mosque
- Status: Active

Location
- Location: Tripoli, North Governorate
- Country: Lebanon
- Interactive map of Mu'allaq Mosque
- Coordinates: Maps 34°25′57″N 35°50′31″E

Architecture
- Type: Mosque architecture
- Style: Ottoman architecture
- Completed: 1561
- Minaret: One

The Mu'allaq Mosque (Arabic: المسجد المعلق) is a mosque, located in Tripoli, in the North Governorate of Lebanon.

== Overview ==
It was commissioned by the Ottoman governor of Tripoli Mahmud Lutfi al-Za'im and constructed in 1559 in the early time of Ottoman Syria under Suleiman the Magnificent. Its name means "hanging mosque" originating in the location of the mosque in the first floor of a structure partly roofing a street. Steps lead up to the entrance of the mosque. Above the door, a foundation inscription on stone is installed mentioning the completion of the mosque in Rabi' al-Awwal of AH 969 (November/December 1561). The inscription reads:

بسم الله الرحمن الرحيم انما يعمر مساجد الله من امن بالله واليوم

الاخر واقام الصلاة واتى الزكاة ولم يخش الا الله فعسى اوليك ان يكونوا من المهتدين انشا هذا الجامع المبارك العبد الفقير محمود ابن المرحوم لطفي الزعيم رحمه الله

وكان تمام انشائه في شهر ربيع الاول من شهور سنة تسع وستين وتسعميه.

The mosque has an octagonal minaret that is decorated by two bands of black stone. The minaret is crowned by two levels having a balcony each, the eight windows of the lower balcony are roofed by pointed arches. Next to the mosque, there is a garden that can be reached by steps.

== Gallery ==
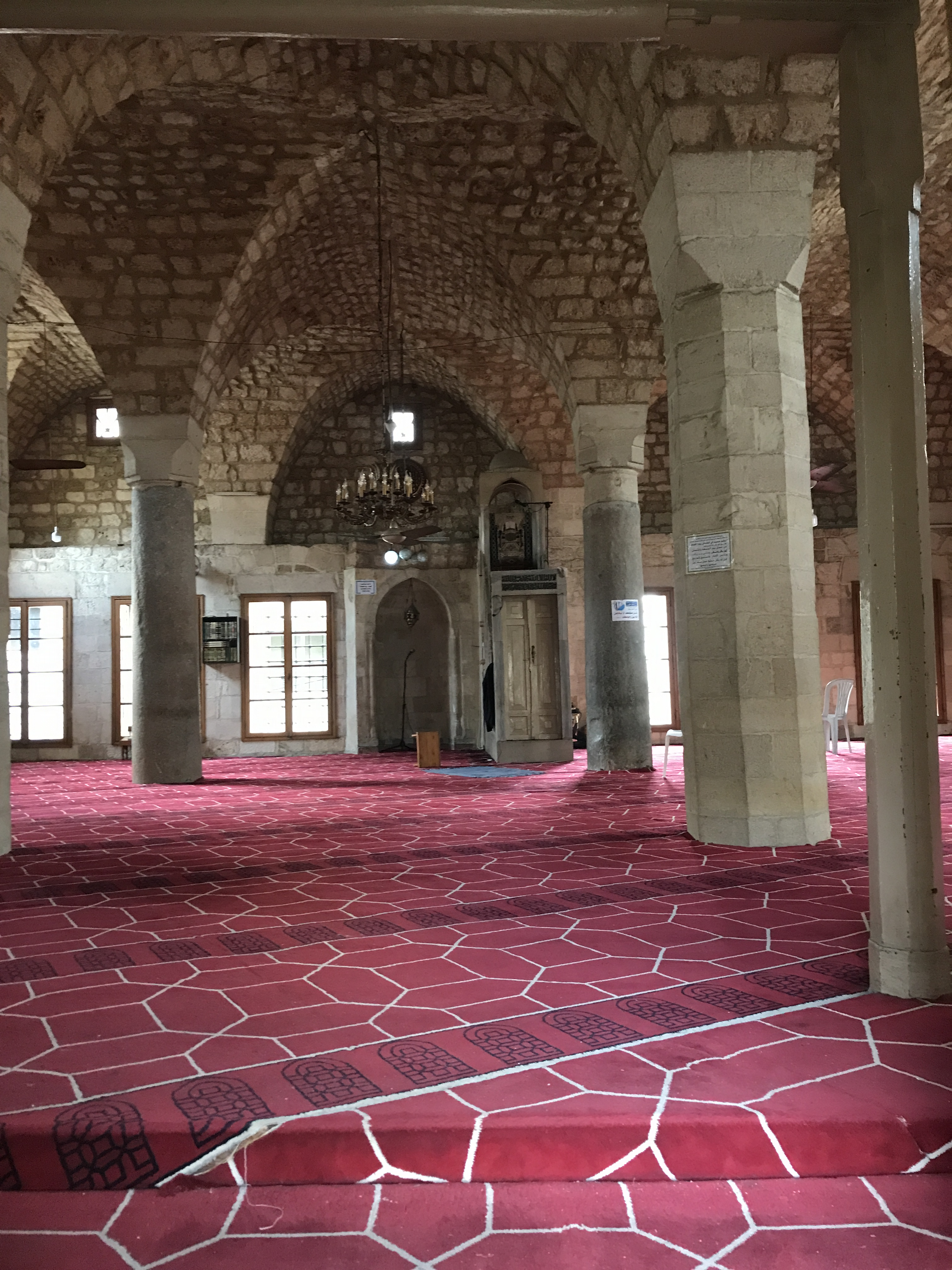
Interior with mihrab and minbar

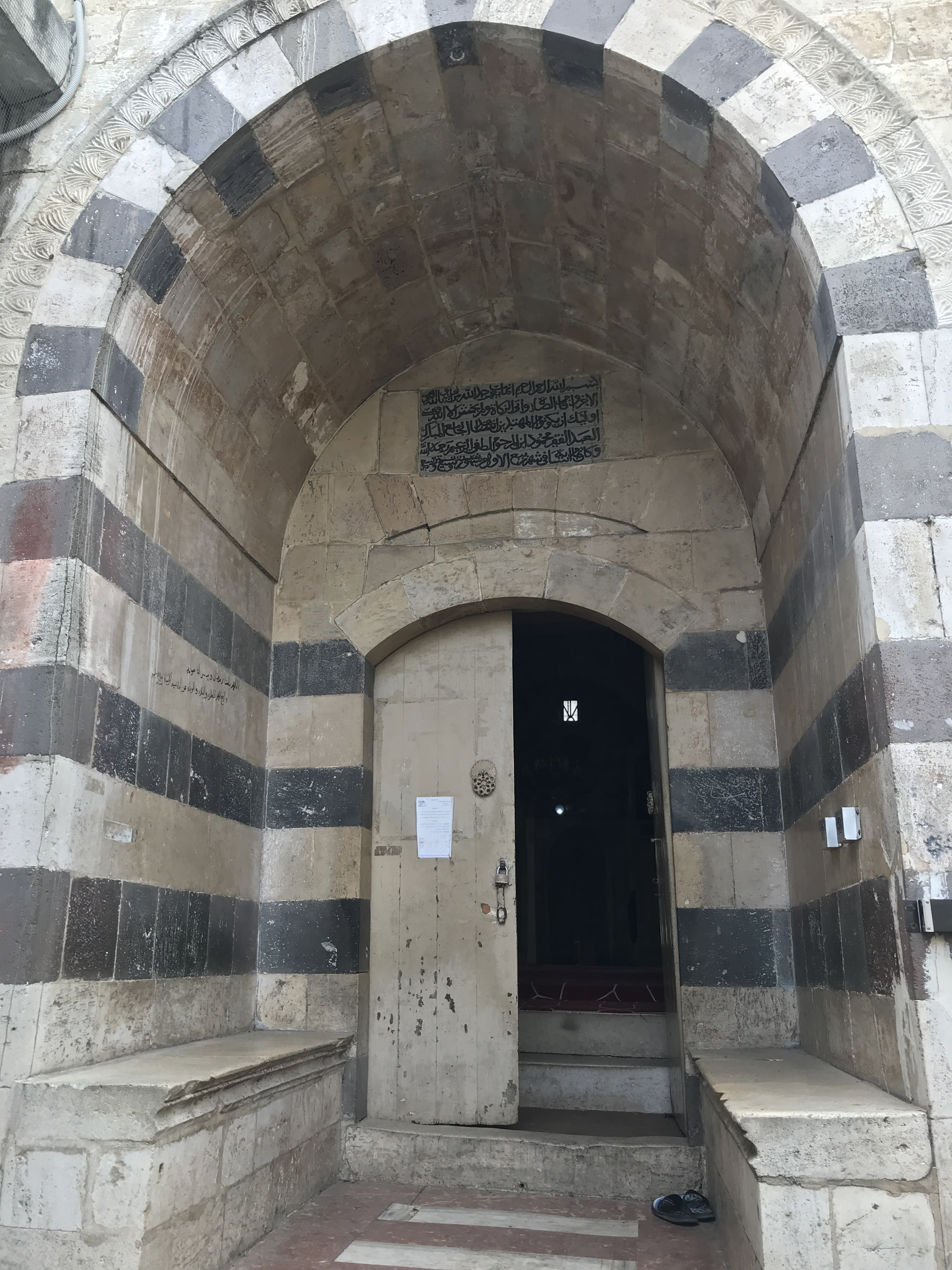
Entrance with foundation inscription above the door

== See also ==
- Islam in Lebanon
- List of mosques in Lebanon
