= Fadel =

Fadel (also spelled Fadl Arabic: فضل or Fadil, Arabic: فاضل) is an Arabic masculine given name, meaning "generous, honorable, superior". Notable people with the name include:

== Given name ==
=== Fadl ===
- Fadl ibn Abbas (611–639), cousin of the Islamic prophet Muhammad
- Faḍl al-Shāʻirah (died 871), female poet of the Abbasid period
- Fadl Shaker (born 1969), Lebanese singer

=== Al Fadl ===
- Al-Fadl ibn Salih (740–789), Abbasid governor
- Al-Fadl ibn al-Rabi' (757/8–823/4), chamberlain and vizier of the Abbasid caliphs Harun al-Rashid and al-Amin
- Al-Fadl ibn Yahya (766–808), one of the Barmakids
- Al-Fadl ibn Sahl, vizier of the Abbasid caliph al-Ma'mun
- Abu al-Fadl Jaʿfar ibn Muhammad al-Mu'tasim (r. 847–861), Abbasid caliph better known by his laqab Al-Mutawakkil
- Al-Fadl ibn Marwan (ca. 774–864), Christian vizier of the Abbasid caliph al-Mu'tasim
- Abu al-Fadl Jaʿfar ibn Ahmad al-Mu'tadid (r. 908–932), Abbasid caliph better known by his regnal name Al-Muqtadir
- Al-Fadl ibn Jaʽfar Al-Muqtadir (r. 946–974), 10th-century caliph during the Later Abbasid era

=== Fadel ===
- Fadel Mohammed Ali, Director of Royal Maintenance Corps of the Jordanian Armed Forces
- Fadel Muhammad, Indonesian politician
- Fadel Al-Najjar, Jordanian basketball player

=== Fadil ===
- Fadil Husayn Salih Hintif, Yemeni extrajudicial prisoner of the United States
- Fadıl Öztürk, Kurdish writer and poet
- Fadil Vokrri, Albanian football player
- Fadıl Akgündüz, Turkish businessman
- Fadil El Ghoul, Dutch-Moroccan EDM producer better known as R3hab

=== Fazıl ===
- Fazıl Say, Turkish pianist

== Surname ==
=== Fadl ===
- Belal Fadl, Egyptian writer
- Mohamed Fadl, Egyptian footballer

=== Fadel ===
- Hussain Fadel, Kuwaiti footballer
- Leila Fadel, American journalist
- Maurice Fadel (1928–2009), Lebanese businessman and politician
- Robert Fadel (born 1970), Lebanese businessman and politician
- Tony Fadell, Lebanese-American engineer, designer, entrepreneur, and investor

=== Fadil ===
- Siddig El Fadil, British actor
- Hassan Fadil, Moroccan footballer
- Sherif Abdel-Fadil, Egyptian footballer

== See also ==
- Fadl (Islam), divine grace in Islam
