= Luciq =

American software company

- Company type: Incorporated
- Website type: Bug reporting, crash reporting, in-app chats, user surveys
- Available in: English
- Founded: Feb 1, 2014
- Headquarters: San Francisco, United States
- Key people: Omar Gabr (CEO), Moataz Soliman (CTO)
- Industry: Software Industry
- Employees: 101-250
- Website: www.luciq.ai
- Users: 2 billion

Luciq, formerly Instabug, is a software company that provides bug reporting, app performance monitoring, crash reporting, in-app chats, and user surveys for mobile apps.

As of September 2019, Luciq reached over 25,000 companies, 400 millions reported issues and feedbacks received, and 2 billion devices running their SDK worldwide. Luciq's software development kit (SDK) used by Android, iOS, Cordova, Ionic, Xamarin, and web developers during beta testing as well as in live production versions of their apps.

It is known for customizable “Shake to Send” feature on the mobile user side and detailed reports on the developer side. Users can attach annotated screenshots, video recordings, and voice notes to supplement their bug reports, which automatically includes network and device logs and repro steps. The SDK also integrates with a range of third-party tools used by developers, including Slack, Zapier, JIRA, Trello, Zendesk, and more.

== History ==
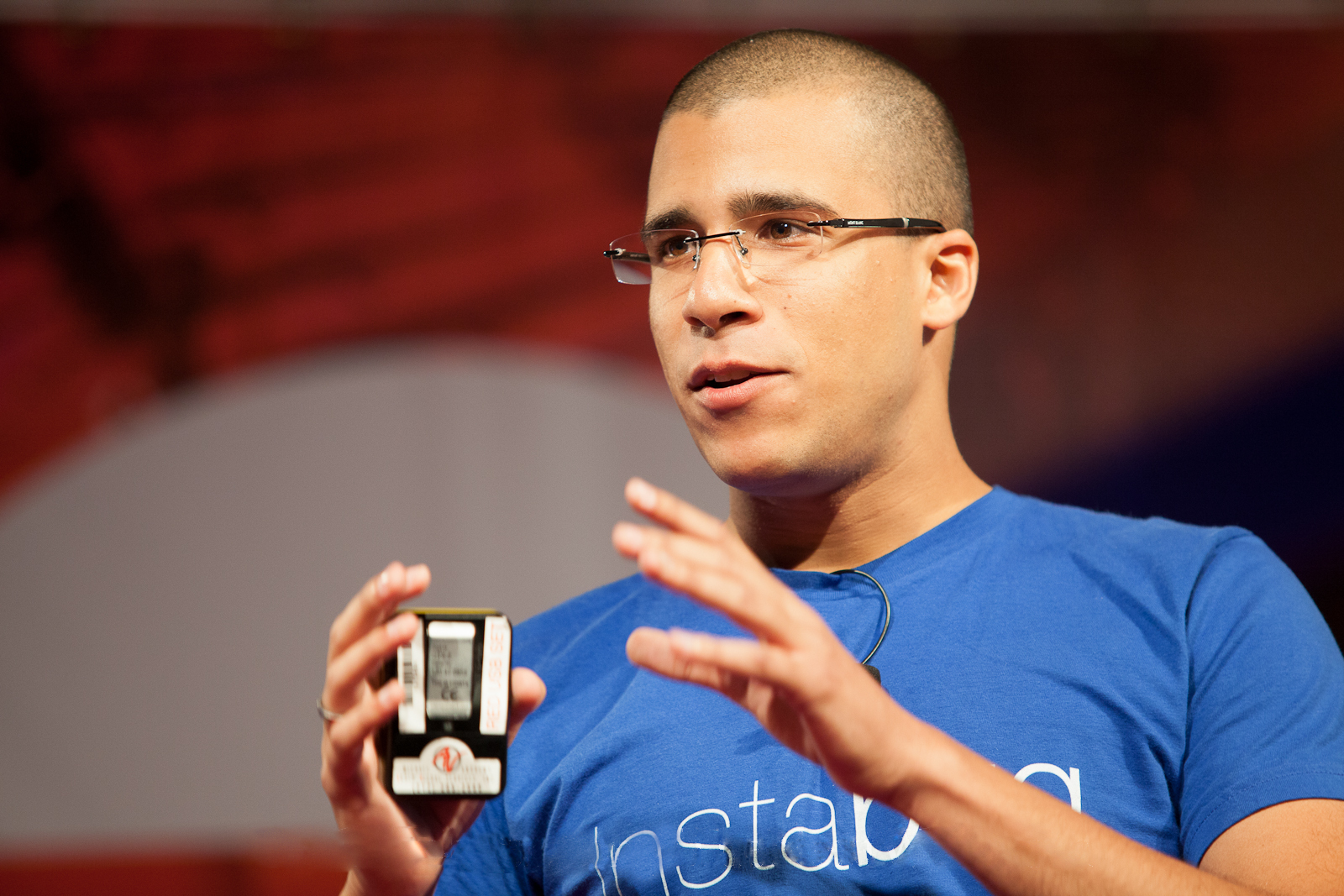
Omar Gabr, 2013

Luciq started in 2012 in Cairo, Egypt by two co-founders: Omar Gabr and Moataz Soliman. During their last semester at Cairo University, Gabr and Soliman created AStarApps, which offered a range of services to mobile developers, including an extremely early iOS version of Luciq's bug reporting tool with its intuitive “Shake to Send” feature. Shortly after, Gabr and Soliman pivoted from AStarApps to focus on the bug reporter and what is now known as Luciq, Inc. They were incubated by Flat6Labs.

In 2013, Luciq secured early seed investments from Georges Harik, Cairo Angels, Middle East Venture Partners, and angel investor Hala Fadel. They also won first place and $50,000 in the MIT Enterprise Forum Arab Startup Competition that year. In 2014, Luciq introduced an Android SDK and crash reporting.

In 2016, Luciq was incubated by Y Combinator, “the world’s most powerful startup incubator”, as part of its Winter batch. In June of that year, Luciq raised $1.7 million in seed funding led by top venture capital firm Accel, including investments from Amr Awadallah, Jim Payne, Tim Abbott, Othman Laraki among others. In August 2016, Luciq was named the #1 Startup in Egypt by Forbes. In October 2016, Luciq introduced in-app chats.

In January 2017, the company introduced Luciq for Web. In February 2017, Luciq introduced user surveys. In July 2017, it launched Betatesters.io, a platform connecting mobile app developers and beta testers. That same month, Luciq was named the third-fastest growing SaaS company in the world.
