= Tripoli, Lebanon =

City in Lebanon

Tripoli طرابلس
- City
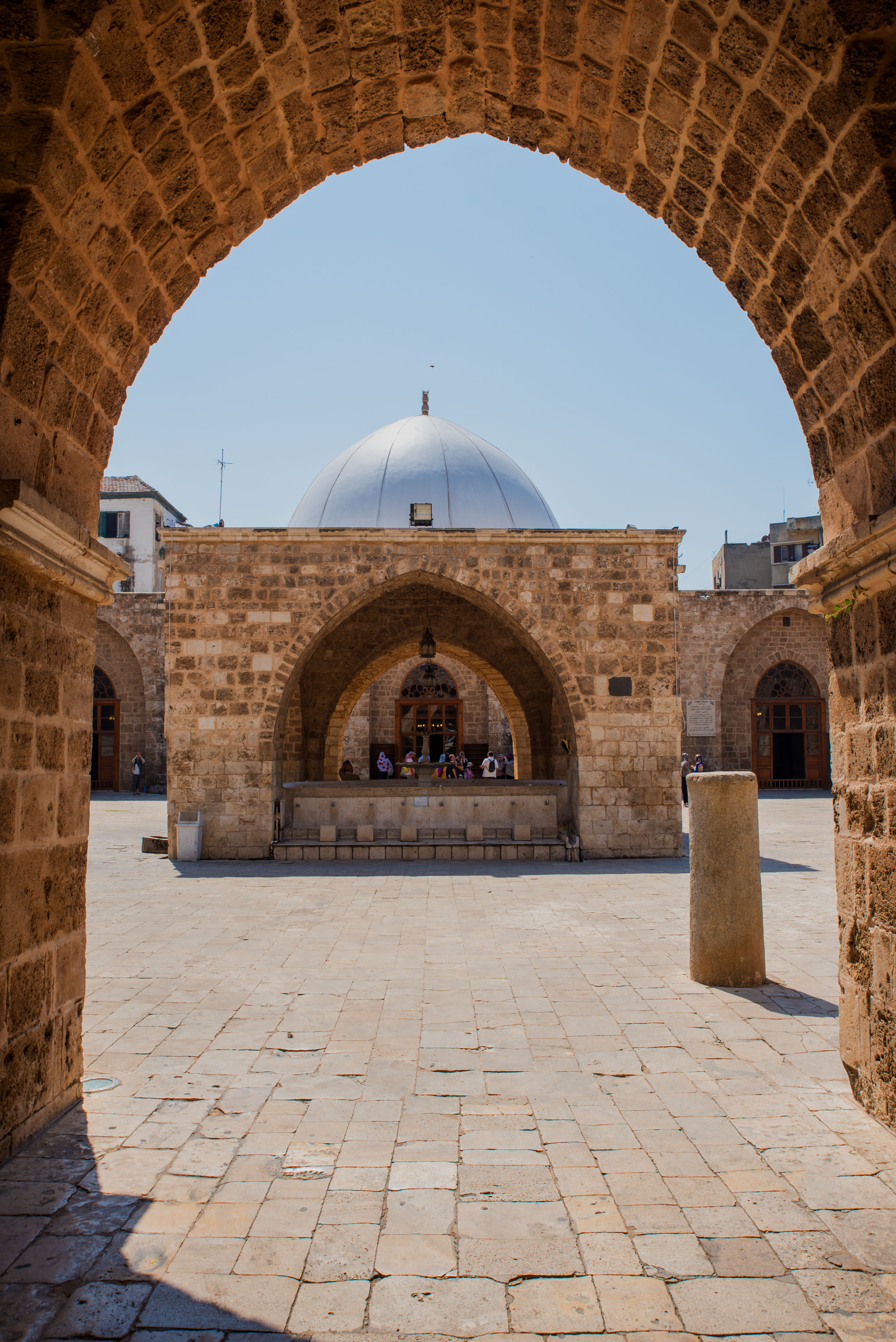
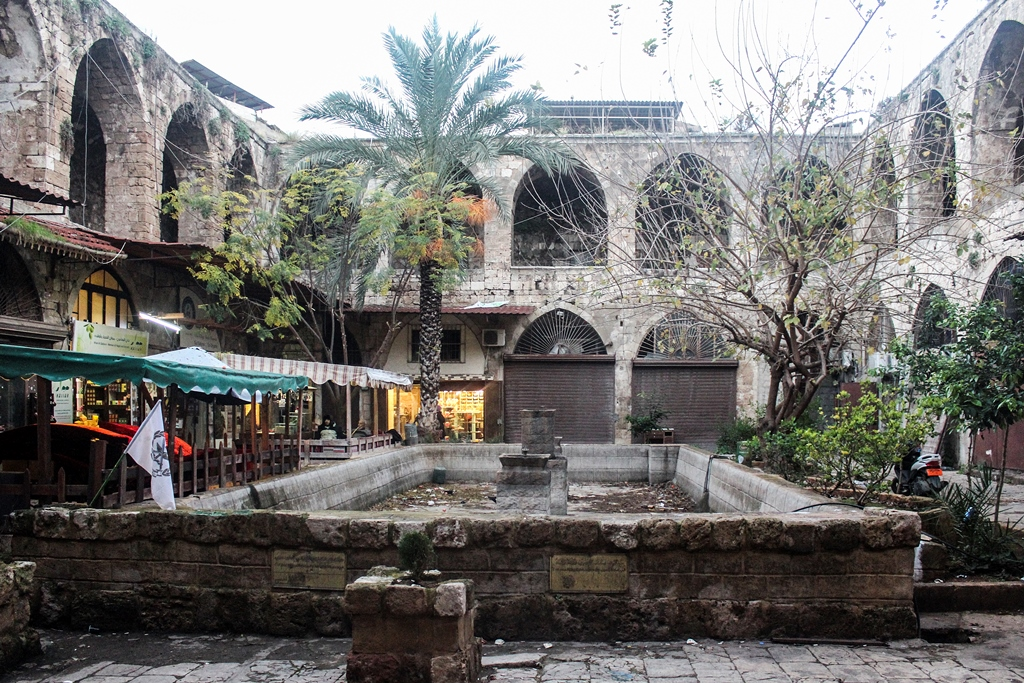
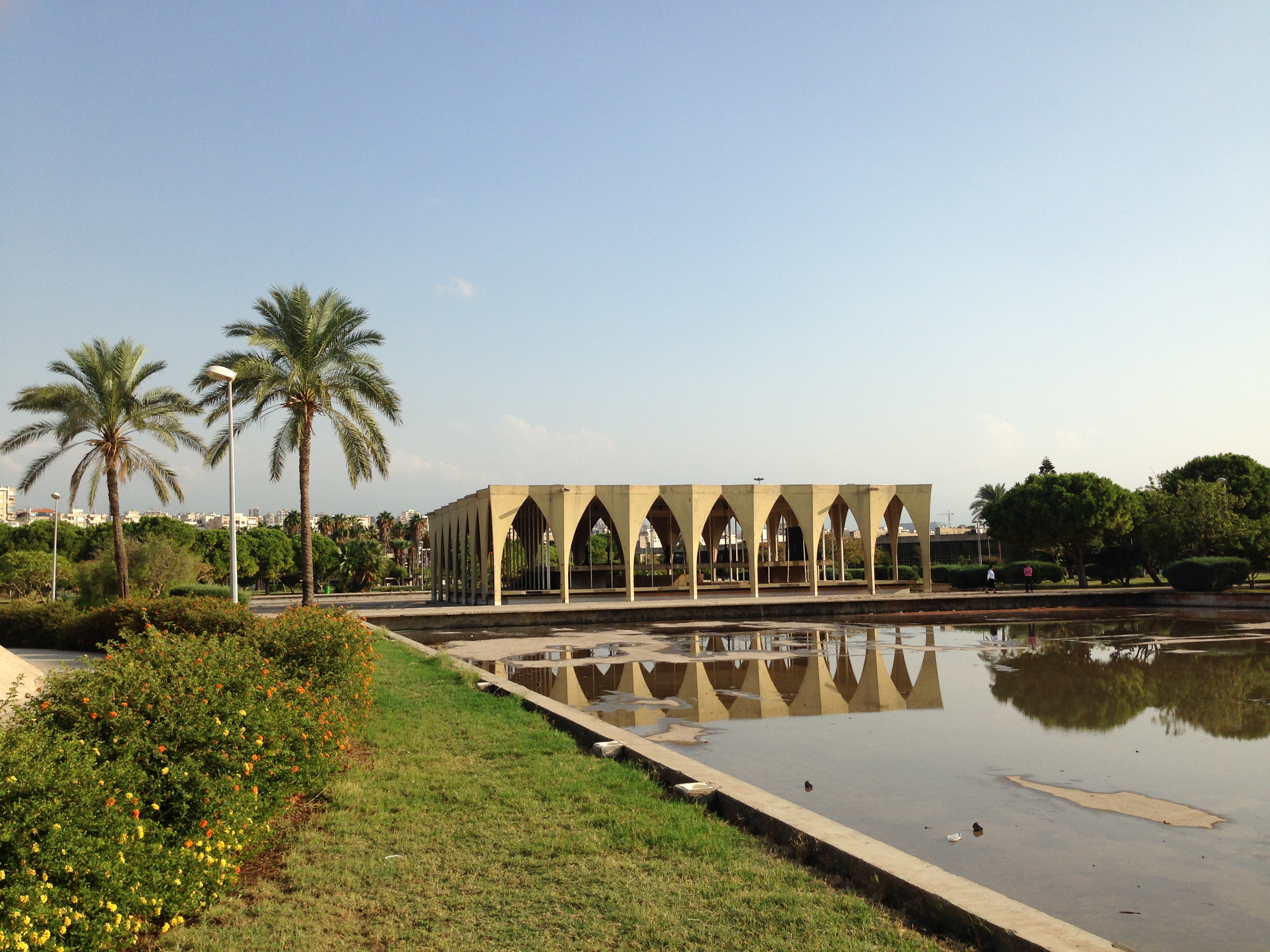
- Mansouri Great Mosque Soap Factory (Khan) Rachid Karami International Fair Citadel of Tripoli
- Nickname: City of Knowledge and Scholars
- Location within Lebanon
- Coordinates: 34°26′12″N 35°50′04″E
- Country: Lebanon
- Governorate: North Governorate
- District: Tripoli District

Government
  - Mayor: Abdul-Hamid Karimeh (Tripoli Vision)

Area
  - Total: 27.39 km^{2} (10.58 sq mi)

Population
  - Total: 892,398
  - Density: 32,580/km^{2} (84,380/sq mi)
- Demonym: Tripolitan
- Time zone: +2
  - Summer (DST): +3
- Area code: 06
- Website: tripoli.gov.lb

Tripoli (/ˈtrɪpəli/ TRIP-əl-ee; Arabic: طَرَابُلُس, ALA-LC: Ṭarābulus, pronounced [tˤaˈraːbulus]; Lebanese Arabic: طرابلس, romanized: Ṭrāblos; see below) is the largest city in northern Lebanon and the second-largest city in the country. Situated 81 km (50 mi) north of the capital Beirut, it is the capital of the North Governorate and the Tripoli District. Tripoli overlooks the eastern Mediterranean Sea, and it is the northernmost seaport in Lebanon. The city is predominantly inhabited by Sunni Muslims, with smaller populations of Alawites and Christians, including Maronites and Armenians among others.

The history of Tripoli dates back at least to the 14th century BC. It was called Athar by the Phoenicians, and later Tripolis by the Greek settlers, whence the modern Arabic name Ṭarābulus derives. In the Arab world, Tripoli has been historically known as Ṭarābulus ash-Shām (Arabic: طرابلس الشام, lit. 'Tripoli of the Levant'), to distinguish it from its Libyan counterpart, known as Ṭarābulus al-Gharb (Arabic: طرابلس الغرب, lit. 'Tripoli of the West').

Landmarks of Tripoli include the Mansouri Great Mosque and the Citadel of Tripoli, which is the largest crusader castle in Lebanon. The city has the second highest concentration of Mamluk architecture after Cairo. Tripoli also holds a string of four small islands offshore, the Palm Islands, which were declared a protected area because of their status as a haven for endangered loggerhead turtles (Caretta caretta), rare monk seals and migratory birds. Tripoli borders the city of El Mina, the port of the Tripoli District, which it is geographically conjoined with to form the greater Tripoli conurbation.

With the formation of Lebanon and the 1948 breakup of the Syrian–Lebanese customs union, Tripoli, once on par in economic and commercial importance to Beirut, was cut off from its traditional trade relations with the Syrian hinterland and therefore declined in relative prosperity.

== Names ==
According to classical writers Diodorus Siculus, Pliny the Elder, and Strabo, the city was founded by combining colonies from three different Phoenician cities – Tyre, Sidon and Arwad. These colonies were each a stadion (150–210 m; 490–690 ft) apart from each other, and the combined city became known as 'Triple City', or Trípolis (Τρίπολις) in Greek.

Tripoli had a number of different names as far back as the Phoenician age. In the Amarna letters the name Derbly, possibly a Semitic cognate of the city's modern Arabic name Ṭarābulus, was mentioned, and in other places Ahlia (relating to the Semitic root of family) or Wahlia (relating to the proto-Semitic word for mud) are mentioned (14th century BC). In an engraving concerning the invasion of Tripoli by the Assyrian King Ashurnasirpal II (888–859 BC), it is called Mahallata (from the proto-Semitic root for encampment or quarter) or Mahlata, Mayza, and Kayza.

Under the Phoenicians, the name Athar was used to refer to Tripoli. When the Ancient Greeks settled in the city they called it Trípolis, meaning 'triple city', influenced by the earlier phonetically similar but etymologically unrelated name Derbly. The Arabs called it Ṭarābulus and Ṭarābulus ash-Shām (referring to bilād ash-Shām, or Levant, to distinguish it from the Libyan city with the same name).

Once, Tripoli was also known as al-Fayḥāʾ (الفيحاء), which is a term derived from the Arabic verb fāḥa (فاح) which is used to indicate the diffusion of a scent or smell. Tripoli was once known for its vast orange orchards. During the season of blooming, the pollen of orange flowers was said to be carried on the air, creating a splendid perfume that filled the city and suburbs.

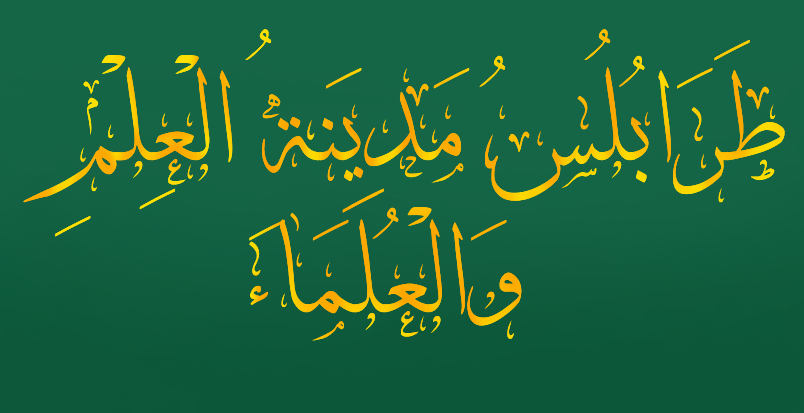
Arabic calligraphic representation of the nickname of Tripoli: "Tripoli, The City of Knowledge and Scholars"

The city of Tripoli is also given the title of "City of Knowledge and Scholars" (Arabic: طرابلس مدينة العلم والعلماء, romanized: Ṭarābulus madīnat al-ʿilm wa-l-ʿulamāʾ).

== History ==
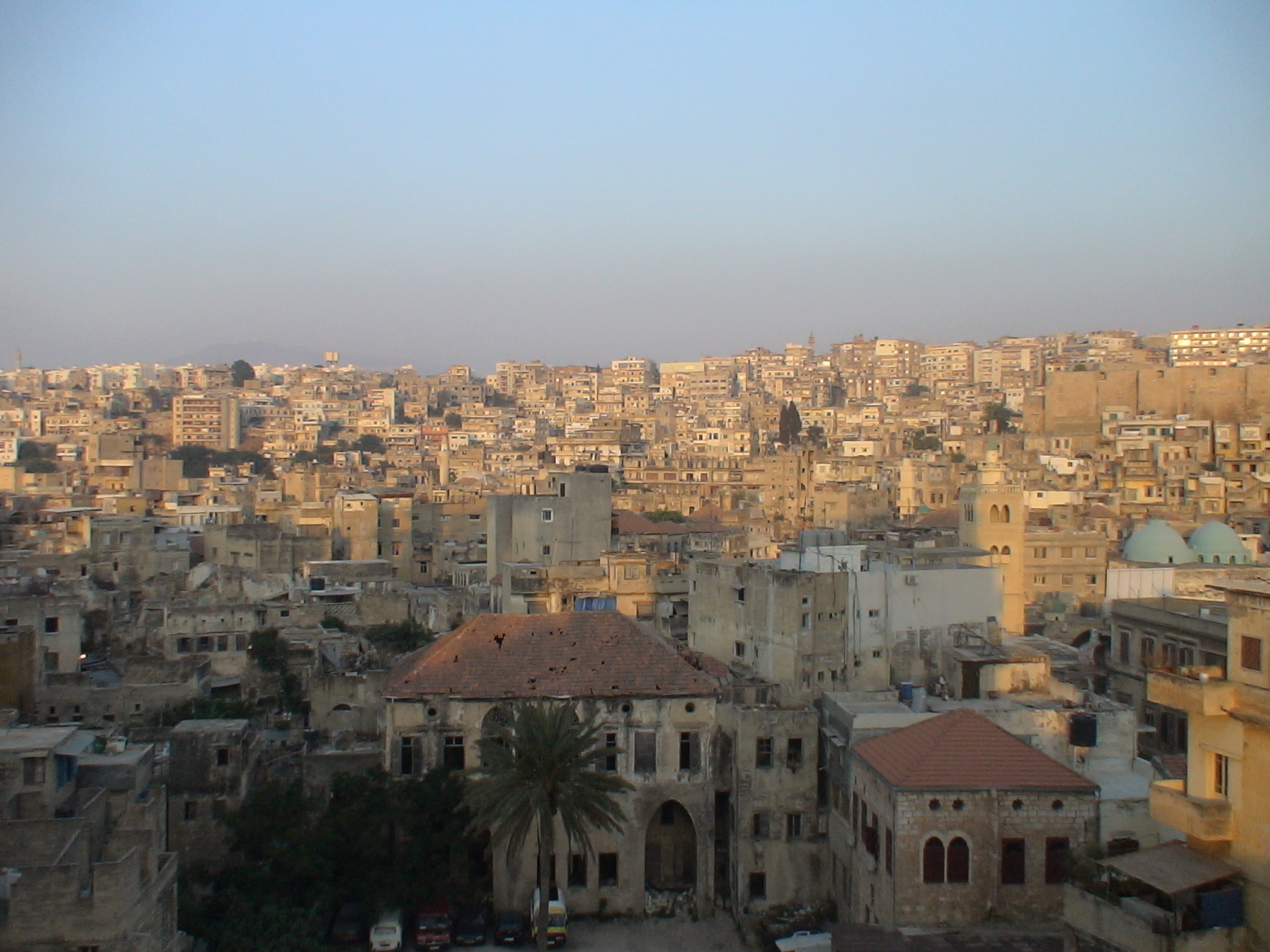
Overview of historical districts in Tripoli

Evidence of settlement in Tripoli dates back as early as 1400 BC. Tripoli was originally established as a Phoenician colony in the 8th century BC. There, the Phoenicians established a trading station and later, under Persian rule, the city became the center of a confederation of the Phoenician city-states of Sidon, Tyre, and Arados Island. Under Hellenistic rule, Tripoli was used as a naval shipyard and the city enjoyed a period of autonomy. It came under Roman rule around 64 BC. The AD 551 Beirut earthquake and tsunami destroyed the Byzantine city of Tripoli along with other Mediterranean coastal cities.

Tripoli was conquered by an Arab Muslim army in 635. During Umayyad rule, Tripoli became a commercial and shipbuilding center. It achieved semi-independence under Fatimid rule, when it developed into a center of learning. The Crusaders laid siege to the city at the beginning of the 12th century and were able finally to enter it in 1109. This caused extensive destruction, including the burning of Tripoli's famous library, Dar al-'Ilm (House of Knowledge), with its thousands of volumes. During the Crusaders' rule the city became the capital of the County of Tripoli. In 1289, it fell to the Mamluks and the old port part of the city was destroyed. A new inland city was then built near the old castle. During Ottoman rule from 1516 to 1918, it retained its prosperity and commercial importance. Tripoli and all of Lebanon was under French mandate from 1920 until 1943 when Lebanon achieved independence.

=== Ancient period ===
Many historians reject the presence of any Phoenician civilization in Tripoli before the 8th (or sometimes 4th) century BC. Others argue that the north–south gradient of Phoenician port establishments on the Lebanese coast indicates an earlier age for the Phoenician Tripoli.

Tripoli has not been extensively excavated because the ancient site lies buried beneath the modern city of El Mina. However, a few accidental finds are now in museums. Excavations in El Mina revealed skeletal remains of ancient wolves, eels, and gazelles, part of the ancient southern port quay, grinding mills, different types of columns, wheels, bows, and a necropolis from the end of the Hellenistic period. A sounding made in the Crusader castle uncovered Late Bronze Age, Iron Age, in addition to Roman, Byzantine, and Fatimid remains. At the Abou Halka area (at the southern entrance of Tripoli) refuges dating to the early (30,000 years old) and middle Stone Age were uncovered.

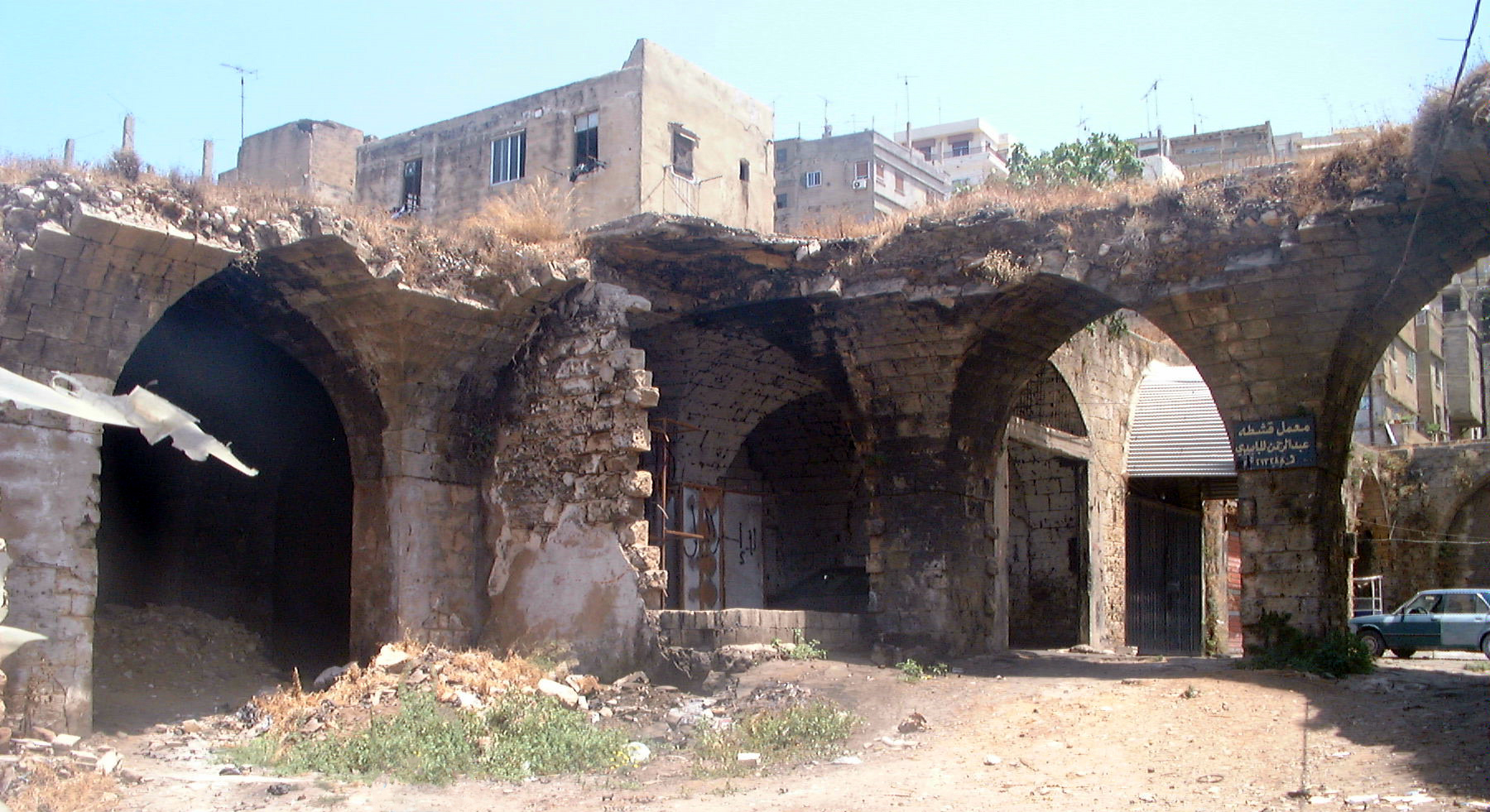
Ruins in Tripoli

Tripoli became a financial center and main port of northern Phoenicia with sea trade (East Mediterranean and the West), and caravan trade (North Syria and hinterland).

Under the Seleucids, Tripoli gained the right to mint its own coins (112 BC); it was granted autonomy between 104 and 105, which it retained until 64 BC. At the time, Tripoli was a center of shipbuilding and cedar timber trade (like other Phoenician cities).

During the Roman and Byzantine period, Tripoli witnessed the construction of important public buildings including a municipal stadium or gymnasium due to the strategic position of the city midway on the imperial coastal highway leading from Antioch to Ptolemais. In addition, Tripoli retained the same configuration of three distinct and administratively independent quarters (Aradians, Sidonians, and Tyrians). The territory outside the city was divided between the three quarters.

=== Umayyad, Abbasid and Fatimid periods ===
Tripoli gained in importance as a trading centre for the whole Mediterranean after it was inhabited by the Arabs. Tripoli was the port city of Damascus; the second military port of the Arab Navy, following Alexandria; a prosperous commercial and shipbuilding center; a wealthy principality under the Kutama Ismaili Shia Banu Ammar emirs. Legally, Tripoli was part of the jurisdiction of the military province of Damascus (Jund Dimashq).

The Jewish community of Tripoli traces its roots back to the seventh century AD, as recounted by the Abbasid-era historian al-Baladhuri. During the caliphate of Rashidun caliph Uthman (644–655), the governor of Syria, Mu'awiya, settled Jews in Tripoli, fostering amicable relations with the majority Sunni Muslims. However, during the persecution of dhimmis by the Shi'ite Fatimid caliph al-Hakim (996–1021), the synagogue faced conversion into a mosque. Notably, during the Seljuk invasion in the 1070s, Tripoli served as a refuge for Jews from Palestine, as documented in Cairo Geniza records.

=== Crusader period ===
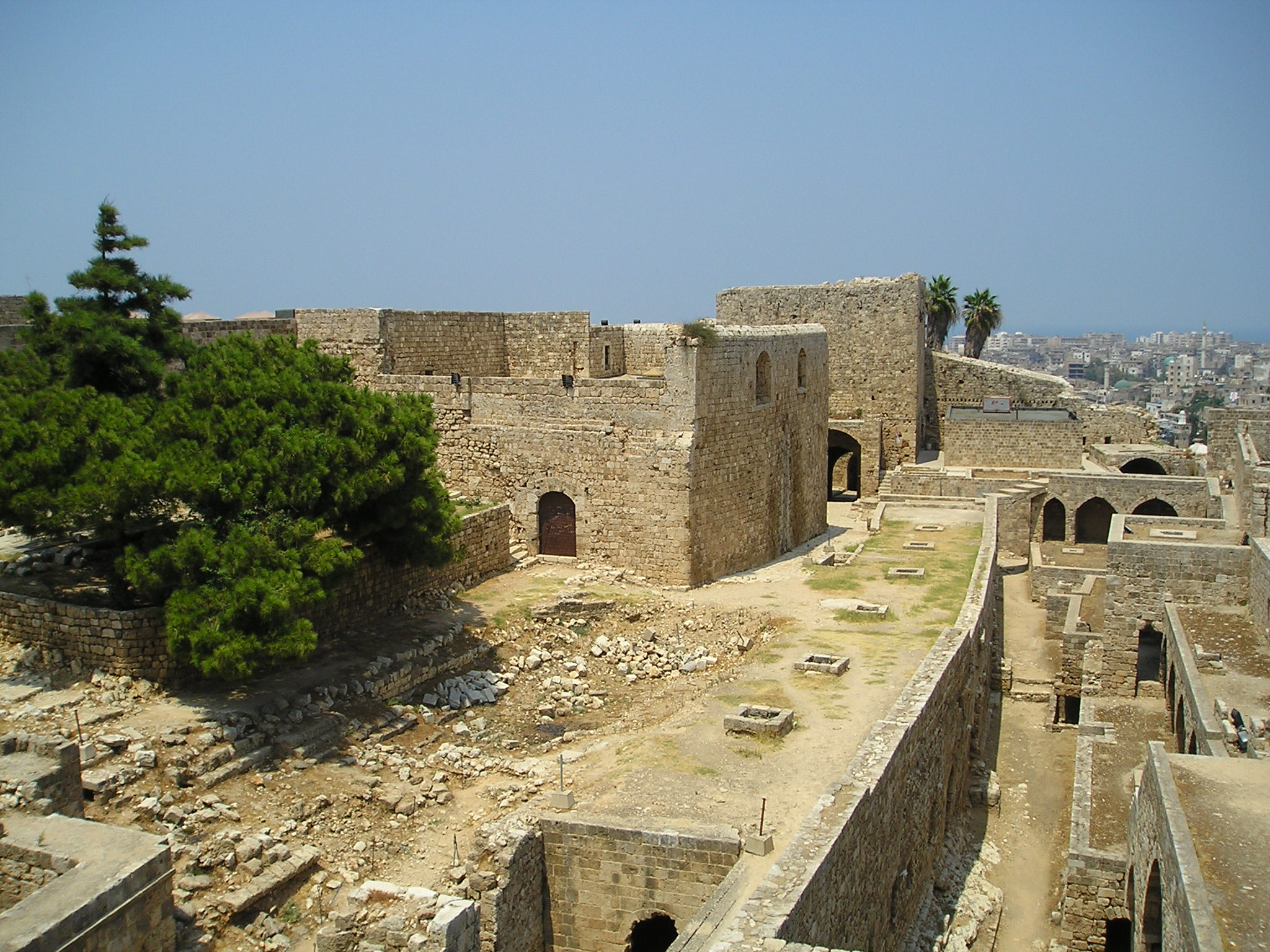
Citadel of Tripoli

During the Crusade period, the city became the chief town of the County of Tripoli (a Crusader state founded by Raymond of Saint-Gilles) extending from Byblos to Latakia and including the plain of Akkar with the famous Krak des Chevaliers. Tripoli was also the seat of a bishopric. Tripoli was home to a busy port and was a major center of silk weaving, with as many as 4,000 looms. Important products of the time included lemons, oranges, and sugar cane. For 180 years, during the Frankish rule, Occitan was among the languages spoken in Tripoli and neighboring villages. At that time, Tripoli had a heterogeneous population including Western Europeans, Greeks, Armenians, Maronites, Nestorians, Jews, and Muslims.

During that time, Tripoli witnessed the growth of the inland settlement surrounding the "Pilgrim's Mountain" (the Citadel of Tripoli) into a built-up suburb including the main religious monuments of the city such as: The "Church of the Holy Sepulchre of Pilgrim's Mountain" (incorporating the Shiite shrine), the Church of Saint Mary of the Tower, and the Carmelite Church. The state was a major base of operations for the military order of the Knights Hospitaller, who occupied the famous castle Krak Des Chevaliers (today a UNESCO world heritage site). The state ceased to exist in 1289, when it was captured by the Egyptian Mamluk sultan Qalawun.

The mid-twelfth century earthquake led to the death of many Jews in Tripoli, as noted by Jewish explorer Benjamin of Tudela.

=== Mamluk period ===
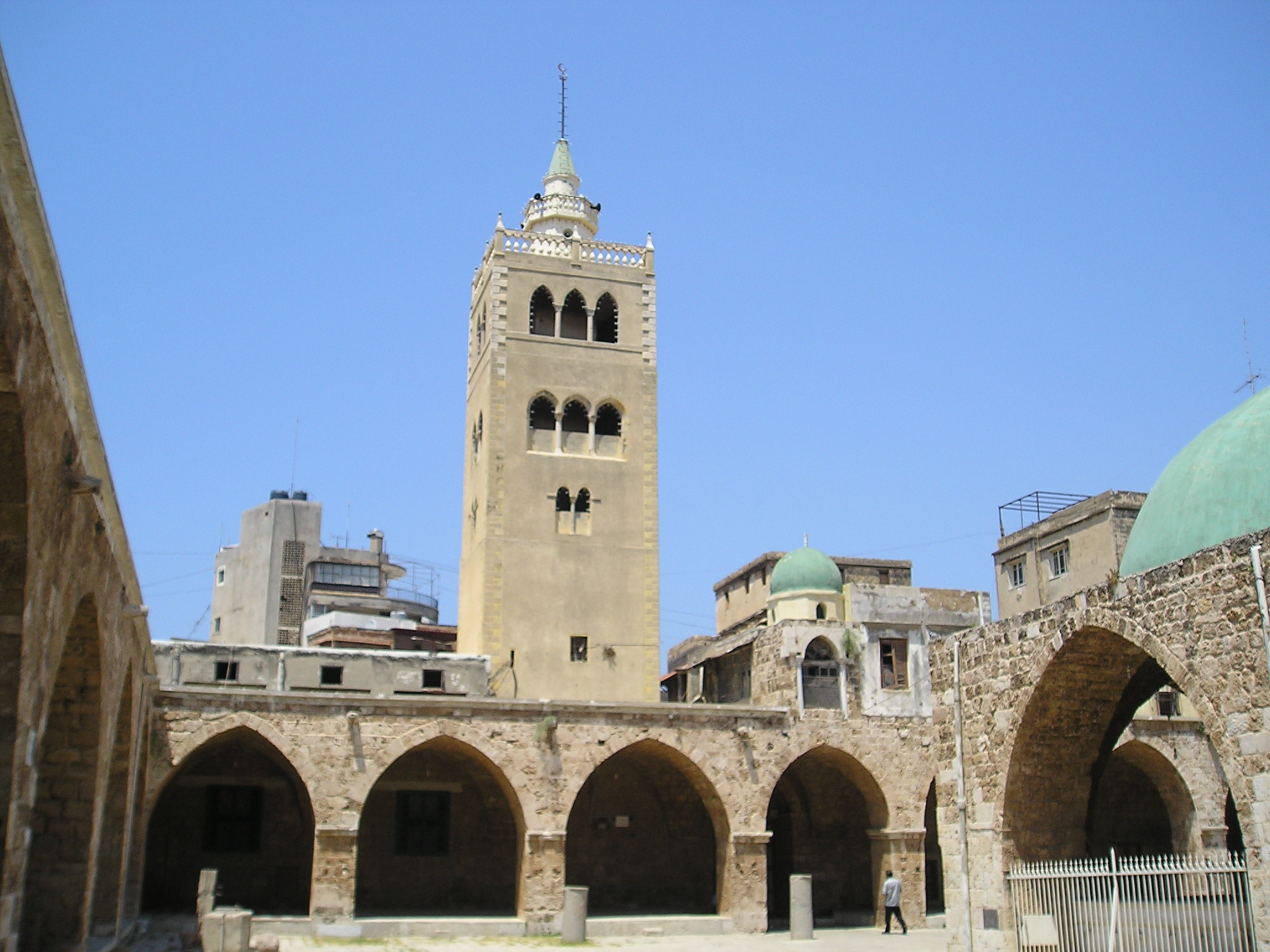
The Mansouri Great Mosque (late 13th century). The arches and courtyard date from the Mamluk period but the minaret is believed to be an earlier Christian structure.

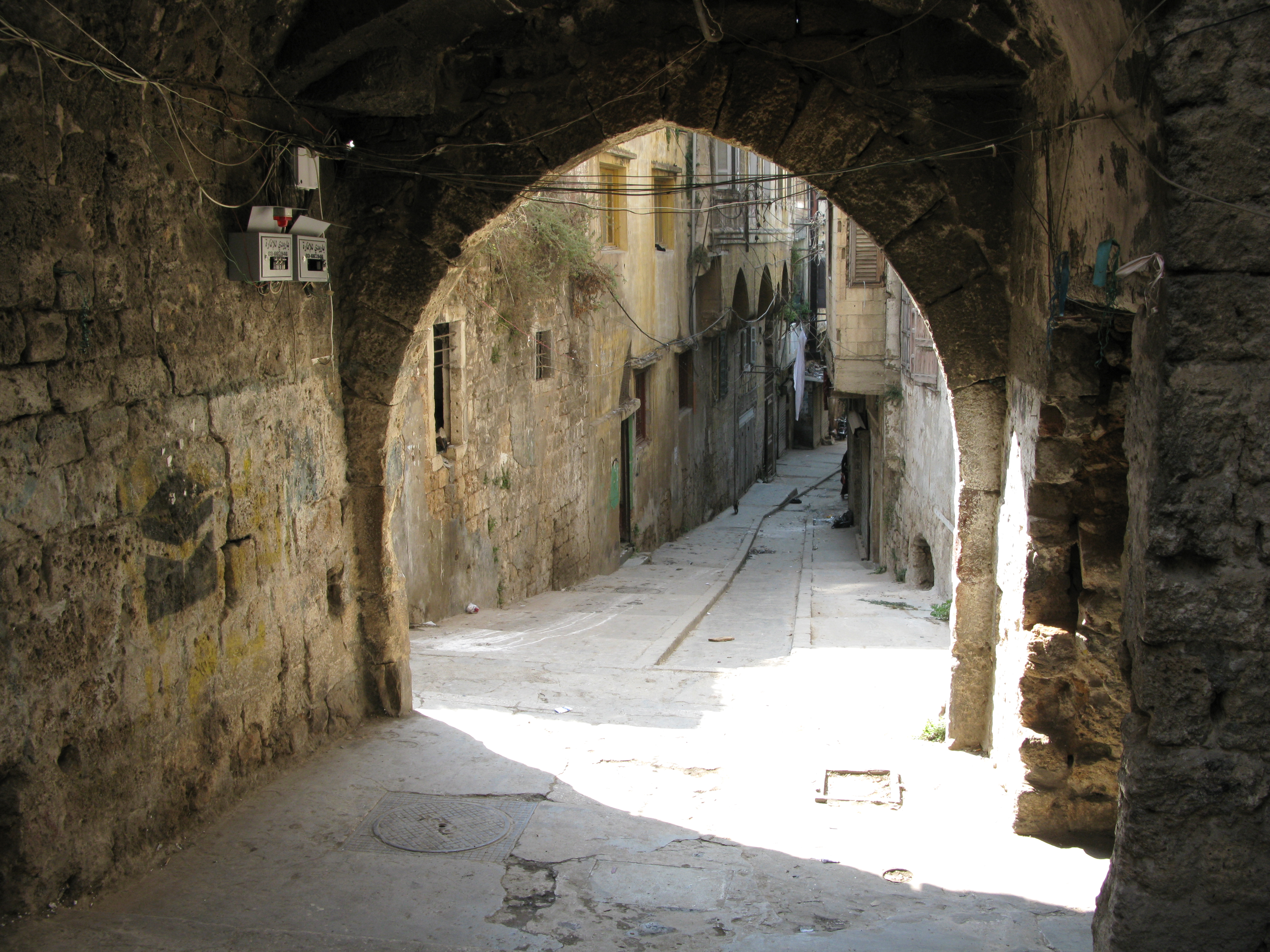
Downtown historical Tripoli

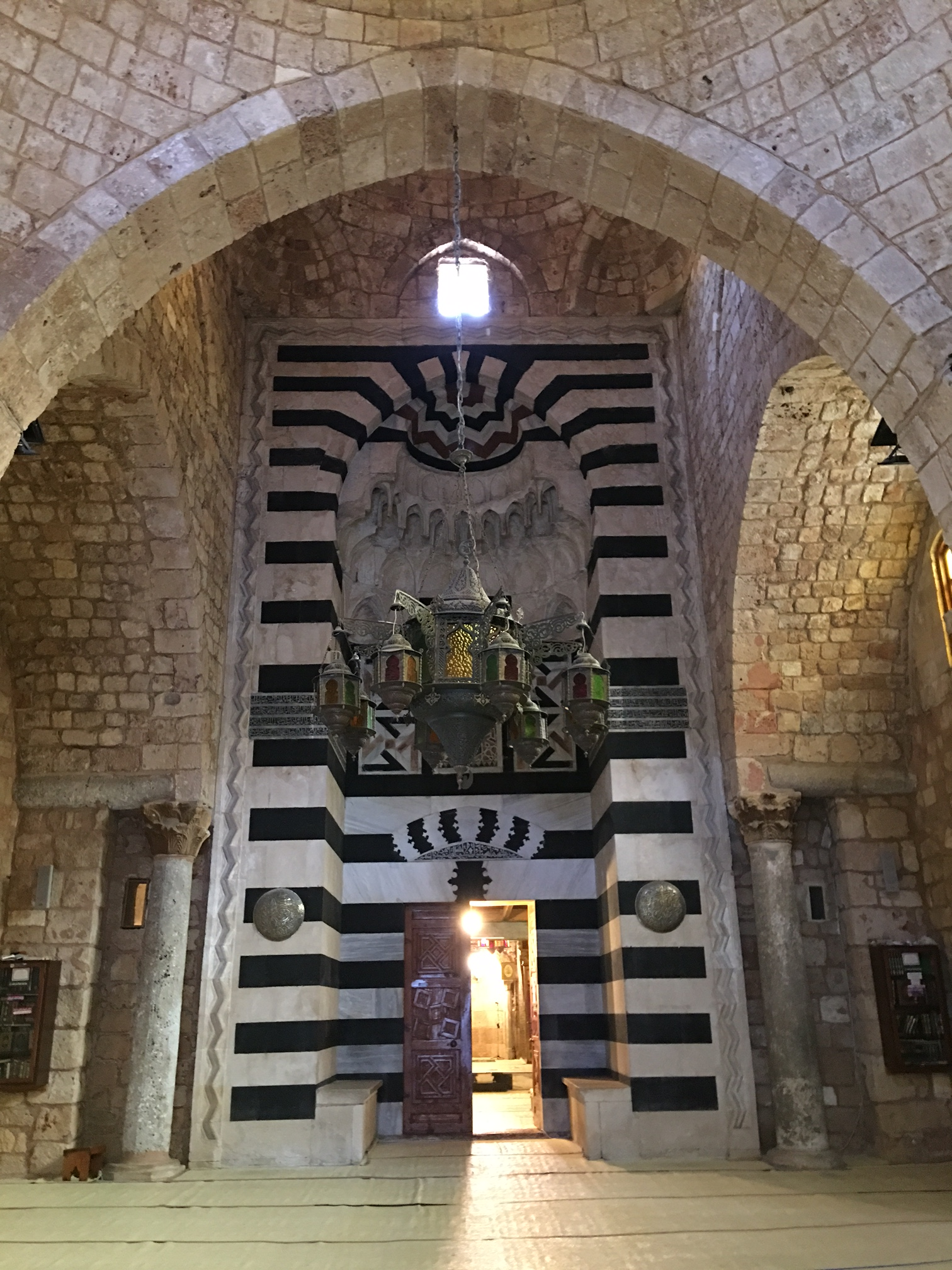
Taynal Mosque entrance

Tripoli was captured by Sultan al-Mansur Qalawun from the Crusaders in 1289. The Mamluks destroyed the old city and built a new city 4 km inland from it. About 35 monuments from the Mamluk city have survived to the present day, including mosques, madrasas, khanqahs, hammams (bathhouses), and caravanserais, many of them built by local Mamluk amirs (princes). The Mamluks did not fortify the city with walls but restored and reused Saint-Gille's citadel.

During the Mamluk period, Tripoli became a central city and provincial capital of the six kingdoms in Mamluk Syria. Tripoli ranked third after Aleppo and Damascus. The kingdom was subdivided into six wilayahs or provinces and extended from Byblos and Aqra mountains south, to Latakia and al Alawiyyin mountains north. It also included Hermel, the plain of Akkar, and Hosn al-Akrad (Krak des Chevaliers).

Tripoli became a major trading port of Syria supplying Europe with candy, loaf and powdered sugar (especially during the latter part of the 14th century). The main products from agriculture and small industry included citrus fruits, olive oil, soap, and textiles (cotton and silk, especially velvet).

The Mamluks formed the ruling class holding main political, military and administrative functions. Arabs formed the population base (religious, industrial, and commercial functions) and the general population included the original inhabitants of the city, immigrants from different parts of the Levant, North Africans who accompanied Qalawun's army during the liberation of Tripoli, Eastern Orthodox Christians, some Western families, and a minority of Jews. The population size of Mamluk Tripoli is estimated at 20,000–40,000; against 100,000 in each of Damascus and Aleppo.

Mamluk Tripoli witnessed a high rate of urban growth and a fast city development (according to traveler's accounts). It also had poles of growth including the fortress, the Great Mosque, and the river banks. The city had seven guard towers on the harbor site to defend the inland city, including what still stands today as the Lion Tower. During the period the castle of Saint-Gilles was expanded as the Citadel of Mamluk Tripoli. The "Aqueduct of the Prince" was reused to bring water from the Rash'in spring. Several bridges were constructed and the surrounding orchards expanded through marsh drainage. Fresh water was supplied to houses from their roofs.

The urban form of Mamluk Tripoli was dictated mainly by climate, site configuration, defense, and urban aesthetics. The layout of major thoroughfares was set according to prevailing winds and topography. The city had no fortifications, but heavy building construction characterized by compact urban forms, narrow and winding streets for difficult city penetration. Residential areas were bridged over streets at strategic points for surveillance and defense. The city also included many loopholes and narrow slits at street junctions.

The religious and secular buildings of Mamluk Tripoli comprise a fine example of the architecture of that time. The oldest among them were built with stones taken from 12th and 13th-century churches; the characteristics of the architecture of the period are best seen in the mosques and madrassas, the Islamic schools. It is the madrassas which most attract attention, for they include highly original structures as well as decoration: here a honeycombed ceiling, there a curiously shaped corniche, doorway or moulded window frame. Among the finest is the madrassa al-Burtasiyah, with an elegant façade picked out in black and white stones and a highly decorated lintel over the main door.

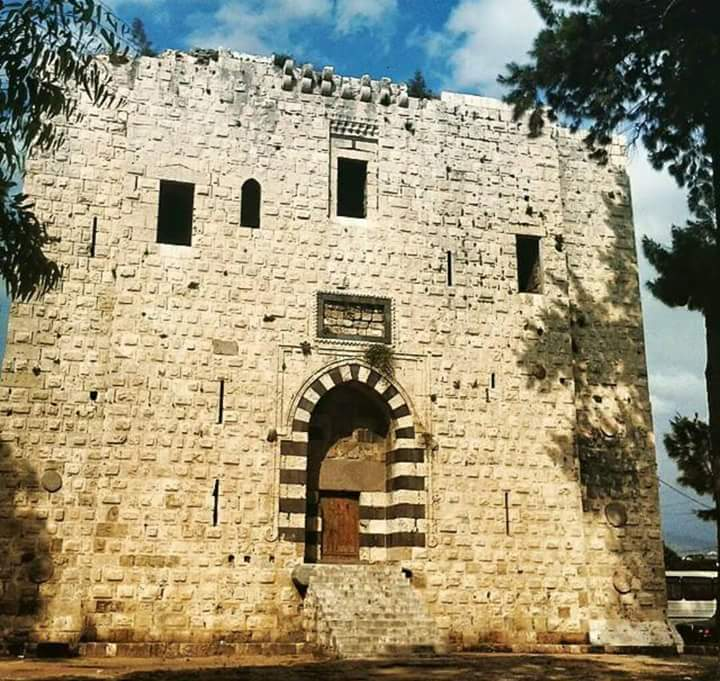
Barsbay Tower

Public buildings in Mamluk Tripoli were emphasized through sitting, façade treatment, and street alignment. Well-cut and well-dressed stones (local sandstone) were used as media of construction and for decorative effects on elevations and around openings (the ablaq technique of alternating light and dark stone courses). Bearing walls were used as vertical supports. Cross vaults covered most spaces from prayer halls to closed rectangular rooms, to galleries around courtyards. Domes were constructed over conspicuous and important spaces like tomb chambers, mihrab, and covered courtyards. Typical construction details in Mamluk Tripoli included cross vaults with concave grooves meeting in octagonal openings or concave rosettes as well as simple cupolas or ribbed domes. The use of double drums and corner squinches was commonly used to make the transition from square rooms to round domes.

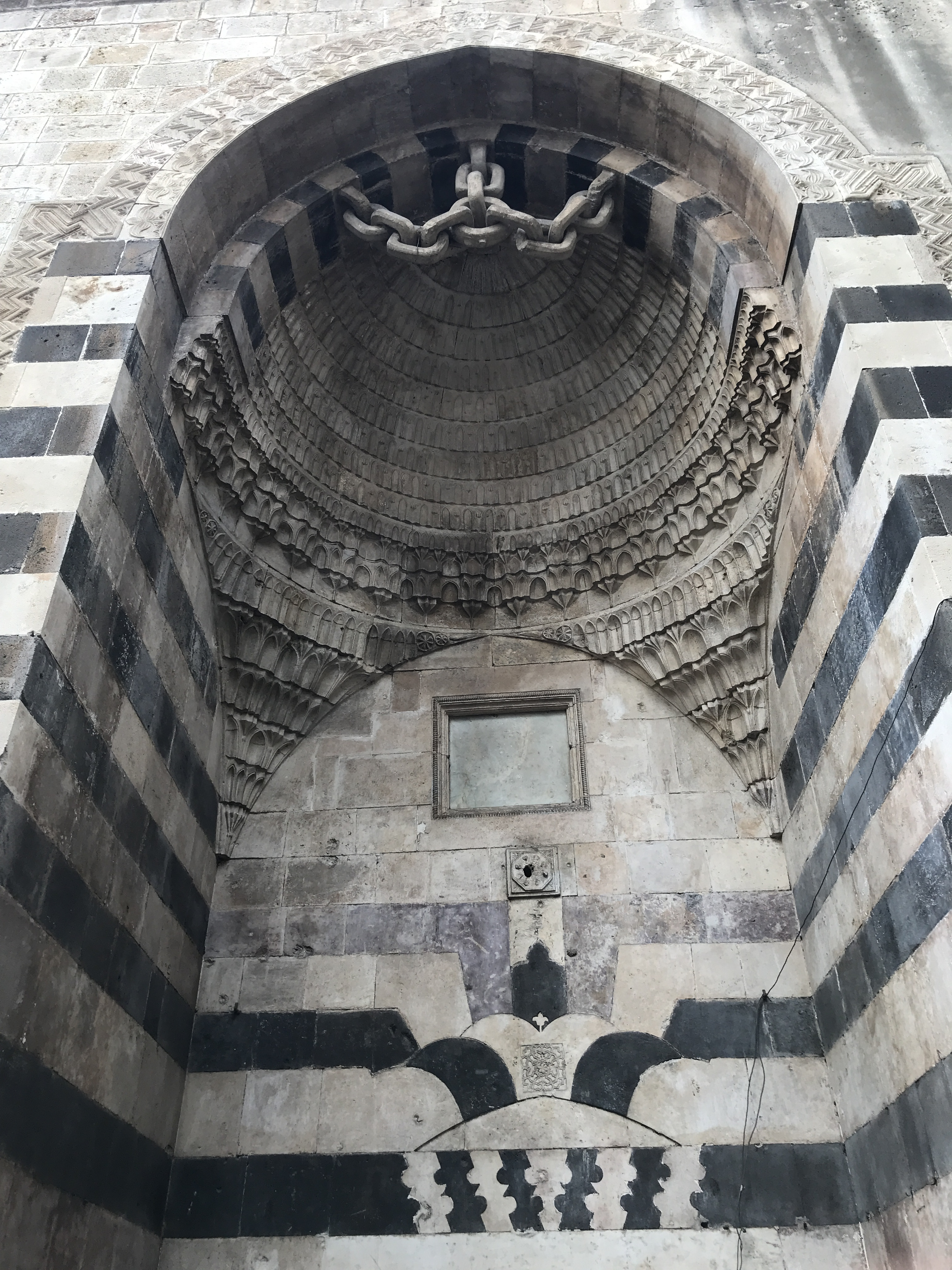
Hammam al-Jadid entrance

Decorations in Mamluk buildings concentrated on the most conspicuous areas of buildings: minarets, portals, windows, on the outside, and mihrab, qiblah wall, and floor on the inside. Decorations at the time may be subdivided into structural decoration (found outside the buildings and incorporate the medium of construction itself such as ablaq walls, plain or zigzag moldings, fish scale motifs, joggled lintels or voussoirs, inscriptions, and muqarnas) and applied decoration (found inside the buildings and include the use of marble marquetry, stucco, and glass mosaic).

Mosques evenly spread with major concentration of madrasas around the Mansouri Great Mosque. All khans were located in the northern part of the city for easy accessibility from roads to Syria. Hammams were carefully located to serve major population concentrations: one next to the Grand Mosque, the other in the center of the commercial district, and the third in the right-bank settlement.

About 35 monuments from the Mamluk city have survived to the present day, including mosques, madrasas, khanqahs, hammams, and caravanserais, many of them built by local Mamluk amirs. Major buildings in Mamluk Tripoli included six congregational mosques (the Mansouri Great Mosque, al-Aattar, Taynal, al-Uwaysiyat, al-Burtasi, and al-Tawba Mosques). Sultan al-Ashraf Khalil (r. 1290–93) founded the city's first congregational mosque in memory of his father (Qalawun), in either late 1293 or 1294 (693 AH). Six madrasas were later built around the mosque. The Mamluks did not fortify the city with walls but restored and reused a Crusader citadel on the site. In addition, there were two quarter mosques (Abd al-Wahed and Arghoun Shah), and two mosques that were built on empty land (al-Burtasi and al-Uwaysiyat). Other mosques incorporated earlier structures (churches, khans, and shops). Mamluk Tripoli also included 16 madrasas of which four no longer exist (al-Zurayqiyat, al-Aattar, al-Rifaiyah, and al-Umariyat). Six of the madrasas concentrated around the Grand Mosque. Tripoli also included a Khanqah, many secular buildings, five Khans, three hammams that are noted for their cupolas. Hammams were luxuriously decorated and the light streaming down from their domes enhances the inner atmosphere of the place.

=== Ottoman period ===
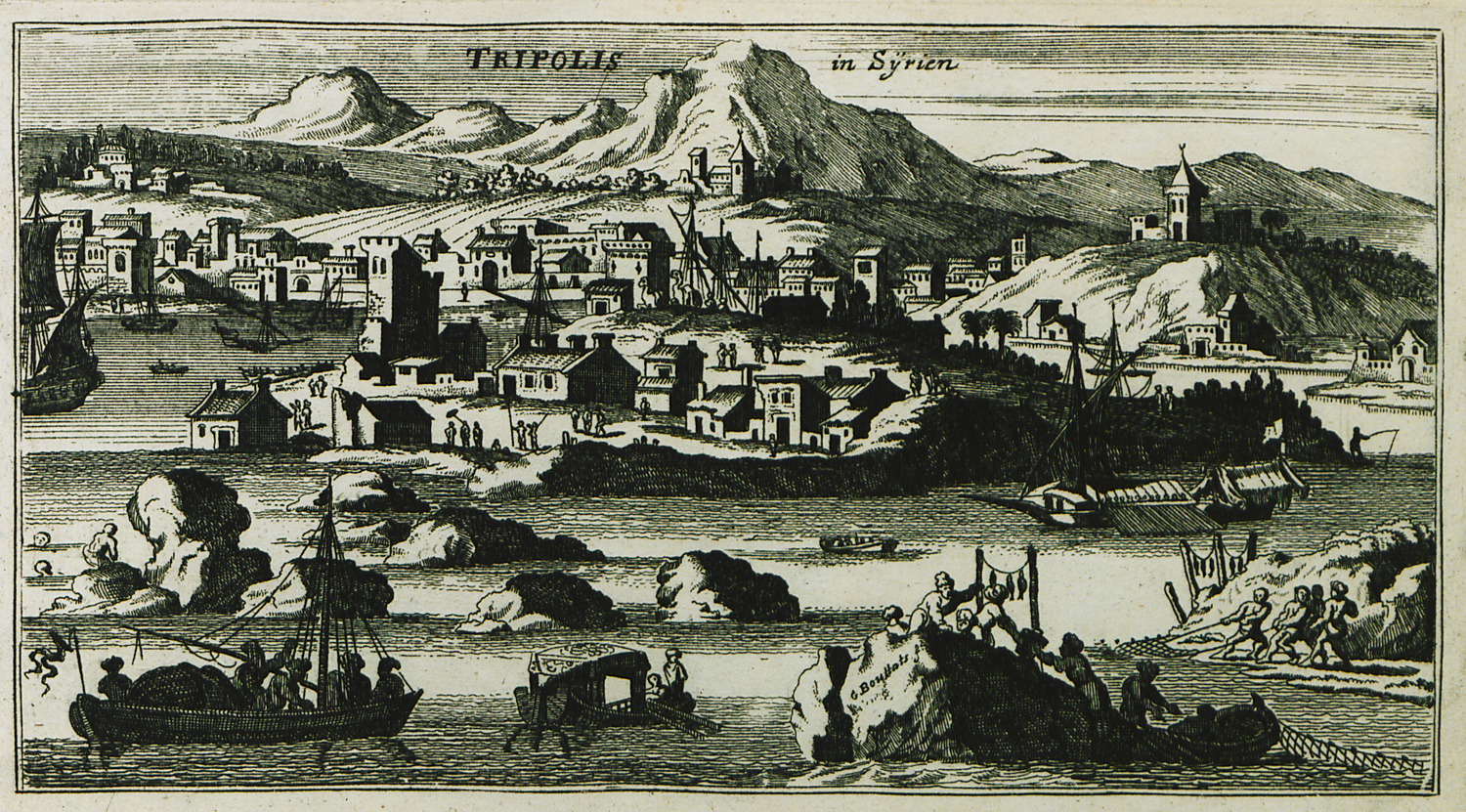
Tripoli in 1690

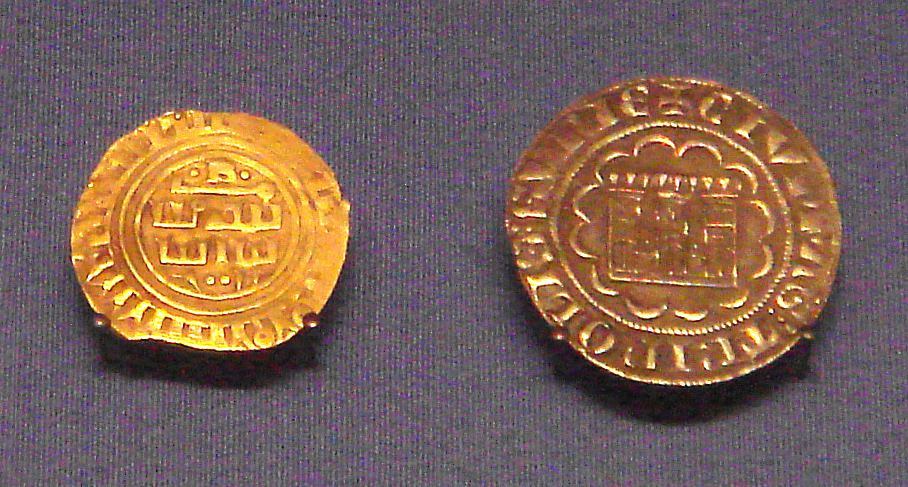
Tripoli gold bezant in Arabic (1270–1300), and Tripoli silver gros (1275–1287), British Museum

During the Ottoman period, Tripoli became the provincial capital and chief town of the Eyalet of Tripoli, encompassing the coastal territory from Byblos to Tarsus and the inland Syrian towns of Homs and Hama; the two other eyalets were Aleppo Eyalet, and Şam Eyalet. Until 1612, Tripoli was considered as the port of Aleppo. It also depended on Syrian interior trade and tax collection from mountainous hinterland. Tripoli witnessed a strong presence of French merchants during the 17th and 18th centuries and became under intense inter-European competition for trade. Tripoli was reduced to a sanjak centre in the Vilayet of Beirut in 19th century and retained her status until 1918 when it was captured by British forces.

Public works in Ottoman Tripoli included the restoration of the Citadel of Tripoli by Suleiman I, the Magnificent. That was the only major project during 400 years of Ottoman Rule. Later governors brought further modifications to the original Crusader structure used as garrison center and prison. Khan al-Saboun (originally a military barrack) was constructed in the center of the city to control any uprising. Ottoman Tripoli also witnessed the development of the southern entrance of the city and many buildings, such as the al-Muallaq or "hanging" Mosque (1559), al-Tahhan Mosque (early 17th century), and al-Tawbah mosque (Mamluk construction, destroyed by 1612 flood and restored during early Ottoman Period). It also included several secular buildings, such as Khan al-Saboun (early 17th century) and Hammam al-Jadid (1740).

=== French Mandate ===
After the partition of the Ottoman Empire, the French created the territory of Greater Lebanon, whose borders forcibly separated Tripoli from Syria, a decision that was contested by Tripolitans. Tripoli's population – mostly Sunni Muslims – found itself isolated in this state dominated by Christians, and so Tripoli developed a strong identity as a bastion for Muslim Arab nationalism and anti-imperialism. During this period, protests demanding reunification with Syria were backed by the Syrian National Bloc until the French cut off their support, resulting in a massive 33 day general strike in 1936.

=== Independent Lebanon ===
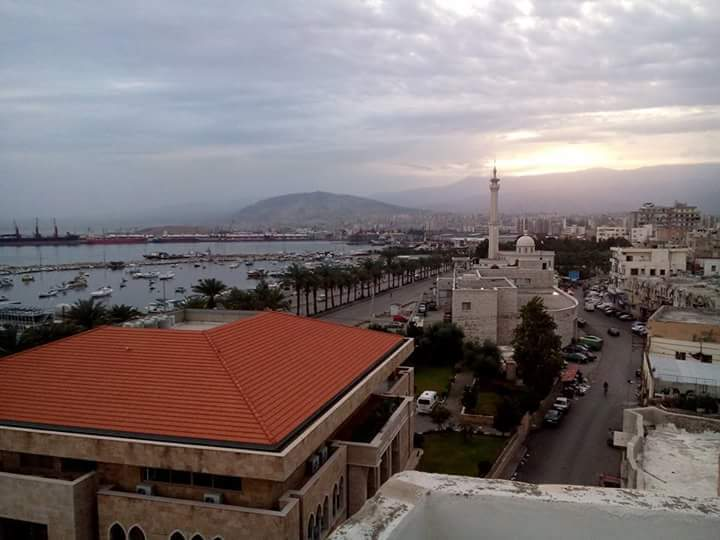
View of the port area

Tripoli has been mired in a period of extended economic and political decline during the period since Lebanon gained its independence. Beirut's rise as Lebanon's dominant port deprived Tripoli of its former preeminence as a trading hub, and globalization eroded the city's ability to compete in manufacturing. Lebanon's civil war, from 1975 to 1990, hit Tripoli hard. On 15 September 1985 intense fighting broke out between Tawheed al-Islami, a Sunni militia which controlled the harbour and was backed by the PLO, and the Alawite Arab Democratic Party's militia. The ADP were backed by the communist Red Knights as well as Syrian special forces. After a week of fighting which saw around 150 killed, 4500 wounded and 200,000 people leaving their homes, the Syrians brokered a truce which involved the Syrian army occupying five key positions and the removal of heavy weapons. The truce broke down on 27 September and Tahweed al-Islami positions were bombarded from SSNP and Syrian artillery positions in the surrounding hills. On 1 October, following an Iranian diplomatic intervention, Tahweed agreed to surrender their heavy weapons and Syrian troops, on 6 October, were deployed throughout the city. A further 350 people had been killed and hundreds more wounded.

The Syrian army remained in the city for almost three decades until 2005:

As a majority Sunni city with a growing strain of indigenous Islamist militancy, Tripoli suffered some of the Syrians' cruelest predations at a time when then-President Hafez al-Assad was engaged in the brutal suppression of Syria's own Muslim Brotherhood.

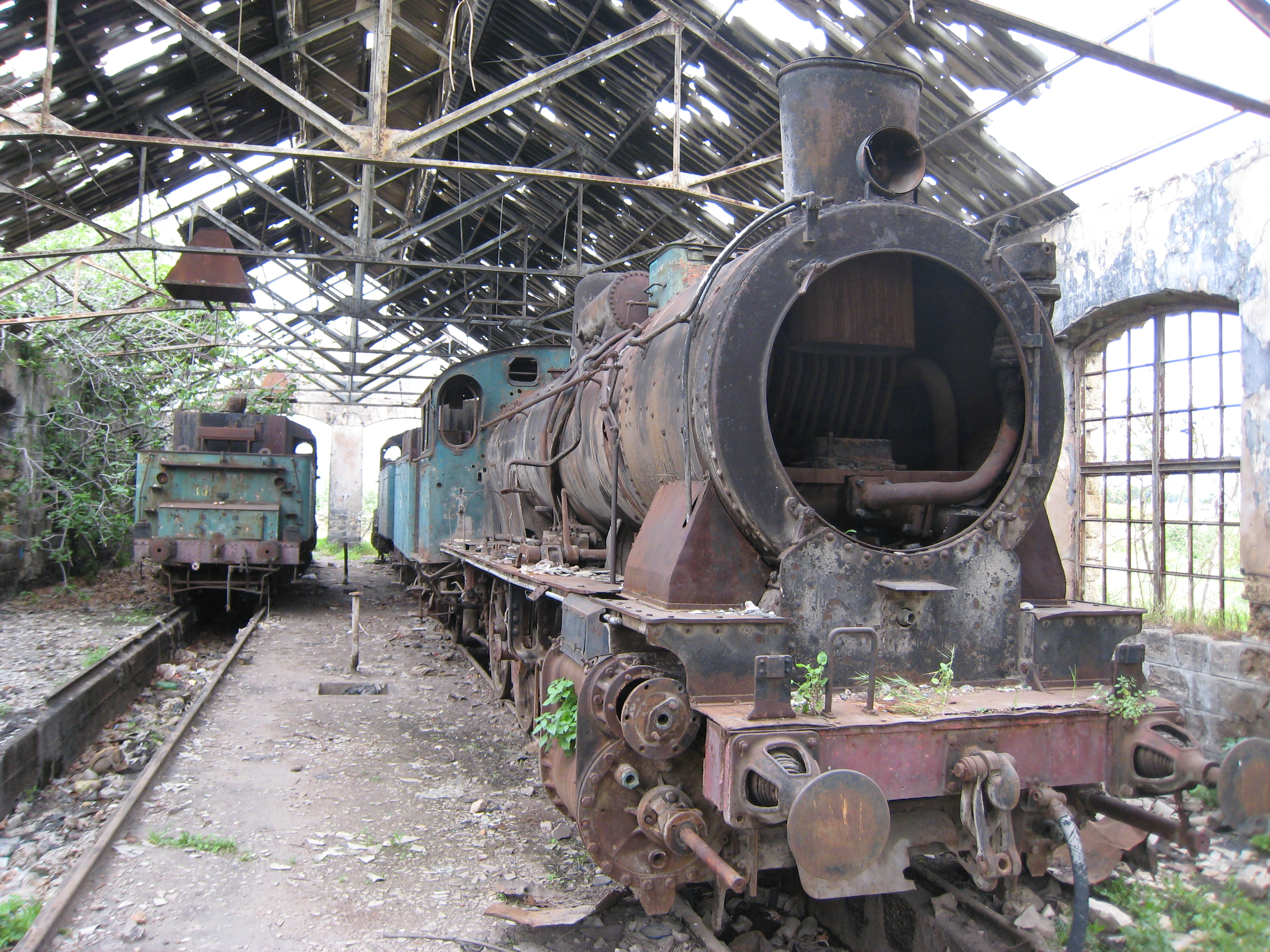
Rusted cars at the Tripoli railway station

Wartime violence and instability triggered waves of emigration and capital flight. It also left Tripoli increasingly isolated, not least due to the dismantling of Lebanon's rail network and the abandonment of the Tripoli railway station. The city, moreover, saw little of the post-war reconstruction funding that Prime Minister Rafic Hariri ushered into Lebanon, with an overwhelming focus on the capital.

In the years since, living conditions in Tripoli have continued to decline. In 2016, the United Nations Human Settlements Programme estimated that 58% of Tripoli's Lebanese residents lived in poverty. That already high figure preceded Lebanon's 2019 financial crisis, which has ratcheted up poverty and food insecurity.

Tripoli's stagnation is attributable, in part, to the city's dysfunctional politics, in which a fragmented array of Sunni political figures (such as Saad Hariri, Najib Mikati, Faisal Karami, and Ashraf Rifi) vie for influence through competing networks of patronage: "No single leader has been able to assert dominance, leaving city politics to devolve into chaos."

== Demographics ==
Historical population
Year	Pop.	±% p.a.
1975	217,936	—
1990	210,574	−0.23%
2000	217,614	+0.33%
2015	282,315	+1.75%

Religion in Tripoli (2014)
Religion	Percent
Sunni Islam	82.15%
Shia Islam	1.39%
Alawites	8.67%
Christian	7.31%
Others	0.48%

In 2014, Muslims made up 92.21% and Christians made up 7.31% of registered voters in Tripoli. 82.15% of the voters were Sunni Muslims and 8.67% were Alawites.

Tripoli has a majority Arab, Sunni Muslim population in neighbourhoods such as Bab al-Tabbaneh, right next to the small Lebanese-Alawite community that is concentrated in the Jabal Mohsen neighborhood. Christians constitute today less than 5 percent of the population of the city. The Christian population in the city comprises Greek Orthodox Christians, Maronites and Greek Catholics, along with Armenians.

Tripoli stands as one of Lebanon's less stable cities, marked by recurrent sectarian tensions among its communities, notably the Sunni and Alawite populations. The impact of the Syrian civil war, beginning in 2011, had extended into Tripoli, where Alawites aligned with the former Assad regime, and Sunnis supported the opposition, resulting in frequent and intense clashes between the two groups.

== Geography ==
=== Climate ===
Tripoli has a hot-summer Mediterranean climate (Csa) with mild wet winters and very dry, hot summers. Temperatures are moderated throughout the year due to the warm Mediterranean current coming from Western Europe. Therefore, temperatures are warmer in the winter by around 10 °C or 18 °F and cooler in the summer by around 7 °C or 12.6 °F compared to the inland parts of Lebanon. Although snow is an extremely rare event that only occurs around once every ten years, hail is common and occurs fairly regularly in the winter. Rainfall is concentrated in the winter months, with the summer typically being very dry.

Climate data for Tripoli, Lebanon (elevation: 6 metres or 20 feet, at El Mina)
Month	Jan	Feb	Mar	Apr	May	Jun	Jul	Aug	Sep	Oct	Nov	Dec	Year
Record high °C (°F)	22.6 (72.7)	22.6 (72.7)	30.2 (86.4)	32.2 (90.0)	33.9 (93.0)	35.2 (95.4)	33.5 (92.3)	33.2 (91.8)	31.8 (89.2)	31.4 (88.5)	31.4 (88.5)	25.4 (77.7)	35.2 (95.4)
Mean daily maximum °C (°F)	16.5 (61.7)	16.9 (62.4)	18.6 (65.5)	21.1 (70.0)	24.6 (76.3)	27.1 (80.8)	29.3 (84.7)	30.2 (86.4)	29.5 (85.1)	27.1 (80.8)	23.8 (74.8)	18.9 (66.0)	23.6 (74.5)
Daily mean °C (°F)	12.8 (55.0)	13.3 (55.9)	14.9 (58.8)	17.5 (63.5)	21.3 (70.3)	24.0 (75.2)	26.2 (79.2)	27.1 (80.8)	25.7 (78.3)	22.8 (73.0)	19.0 (66.2)	14.6 (58.3)	19.9 (67.9)
Mean daily minimum °C (°F)	9.5 (49.1)	9.8 (49.6)	11.1 (52.0)	13.7 (56.7)	17.1 (62.8)	19.8 (67.6)	22.1 (71.8)	23.0 (73.4)	21.5 (70.7)	18.8 (65.8)	15.4 (59.7)	10.9 (51.6)	16.1 (60.9)
Record low °C (°F)	−0.8 (30.6)	3.2 (37.8)	5.0 (41.0)	9.2 (48.6)	11.4 (52.5)	15.6 (60.1)	19.0 (66.2)	20.6 (69.1)	17.0 (62.6)	11.2 (52.2)	8.0 (46.4)	3.4 (38.1)	−0.8 (30.6)
Average precipitation mm (inches)	195 (7.7)	119 (4.7)	114 (4.5)	54 (2.1)	16 (0.6)	1 (0.0)	trace	trace	12 (0.5)	57 (2.2)	108 (4.3)	176 (6.9)	852 (33.5)
Average precipitation days (≥ 0.1 mm)	13	14	11	6	2	trace	0	0	1	6	8	13	74
Average relative humidity (%)	69	72	70	74	76	75	75	73	69	69	66	72	72
Source: Deutscher Wetterdienst (precipitation 1951–1980, precipitation days 1931–1964, humidity 1959–1967)

=== Offshore islands ===
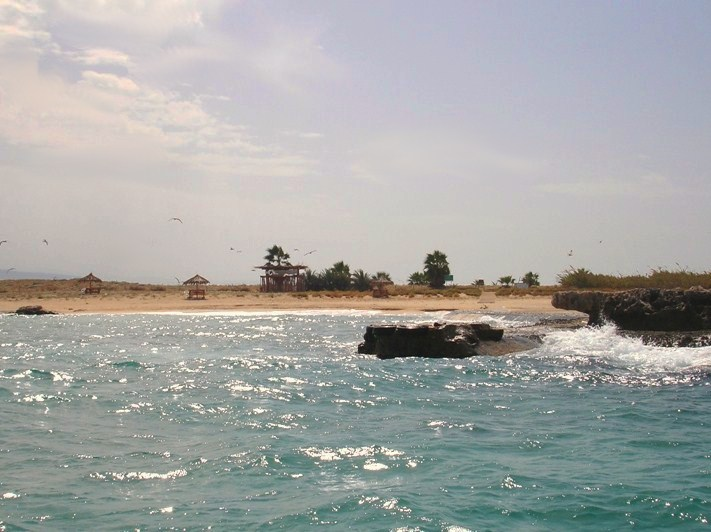
Palm Islands Nature Reserve

Tripoli has many offshore islands. The Palm Islands Nature Reserve, or the Rabbits' Island, is the largest of the islands with an area of 20 ha (49 acres). The name "Araneb" or Rabbits comes from the great numbers of rabbits that were kept on the island during the time of the French mandate early in the 20th century. It is now a nature reserve for green turtles, rare birds and rabbits. Declared as a protected area by UNESCO in 1992, camping, setting fires or other depredation is forbidden. In addition to its scenic landscape, the Palm Island is also a cultural heritage site. Evidence for human occupation, dated back to the Crusader period, was uncovered during 1973 excavations by the General Directorate of Antiquities. The Bakar Islands, also known as Abdulwahab Island, were leased to the company of Adel and Khiereddine Abdulwahab as a shipyard, during the Ottoman imperial rule and which is still a ship and marine contractor. It was also known as St Thomas Island during the Crusades.

The island on the opposite side of Palms Island, which is a large flat sandy beach, is Ramkin Island. This island is largely made up of cliffs and rocks.

== Landmarks ==
City of Tripoli, Lebanon
Legend
1 Citadel of Tripoli
2 Tripoli Clock Tower
3 Barsbay Tower
4 Port of Tripoli
5 Old Railway Station
6 Beirut Arab University (BAU)
7 Lebanese University
8 City University
9 Arts, Sciences and Technology University in Lebanon (AUL)
10 Jinan University Lebanon
11 University of Tripoli
12 AZM University
13 Al-Saʼeḥ Library
14 Al-Salam Hospital
15 Olympic Stadium
16 Rachid Karami International Fair
17 Municipal Stadium
18 St George Cathedral
19 Al-Tawbat Mosque
20 Al-Attar Mosque
21 Al-Burtasi Mosque
22 Al-Uwaysiyat Mosque
23 Abd al-Wahid Mosque
24 Mansouri Great Mosque
25 Mu'allaq Mosque
26 Taynal Mosque

=== Citadel of Tripoli ===
The Citadel of Tripoli is also known as the Castle of Saint-Gilles (Arabic: قلعة سان جيل Qalʻat Sān Jīl; French: Château Saint-Gilles), in reference to Raymond de Saint-Gilles, who dominated the city in 1102 and commanded a fortress to be built in which he named Mont Pèlerin (Mount Pilgrim). The original castle was burnt down in 1289, and rebuilt again on numerous occasions and was rebuilt in 1307–08 by Emir Essendemir Kurgi.

Later the citadel was rebuilt in part by the Ottoman Empire which can be seen today, with its massive Ottoman gateway, over which is an engraving from Süleyman the Magnificent who had ordered the restoration. In the early 19th century, the Citadel was extensively restored by the Ottoman Governor of Tripoli Mustafa Agha Barbar.

=== Clock Tower ===
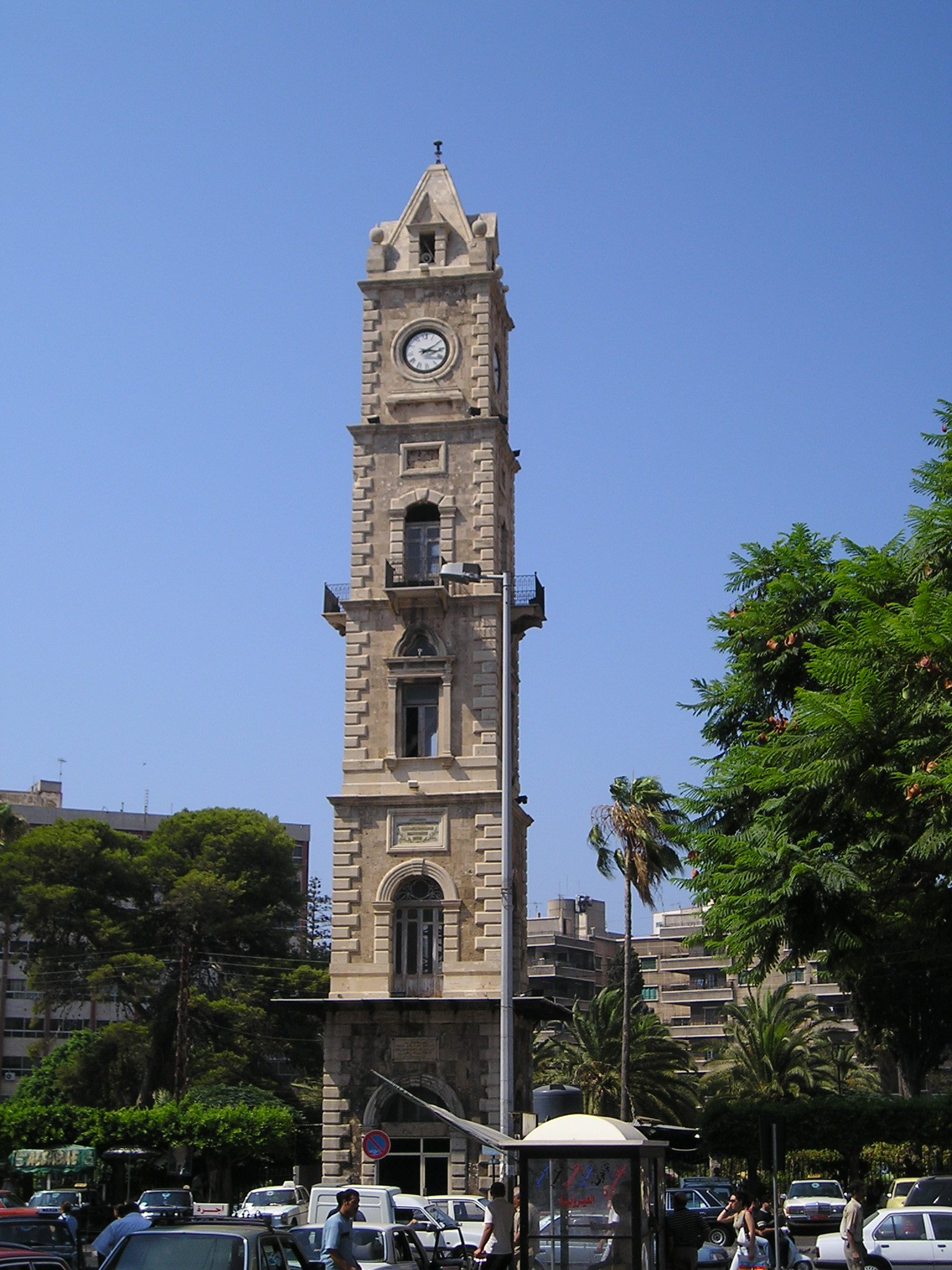
The Al-Tell Clock Tower

The Clock Tower is one of the most iconic monuments in Tripoli. The tower is located in Al-Tell square, and was gifted to the city by the Ottoman Sultan Abdul Hamid II. It was erected in 1906 to celebrate the 30th year of Abdulhamid II of the Ottoman Empire, like the Jaffa Clock Tower in Israel and many others throughout the Empire.

The Clock Tower underwent a renovation in 1992, and now the clock tower is again operational.

=== Hammams ===
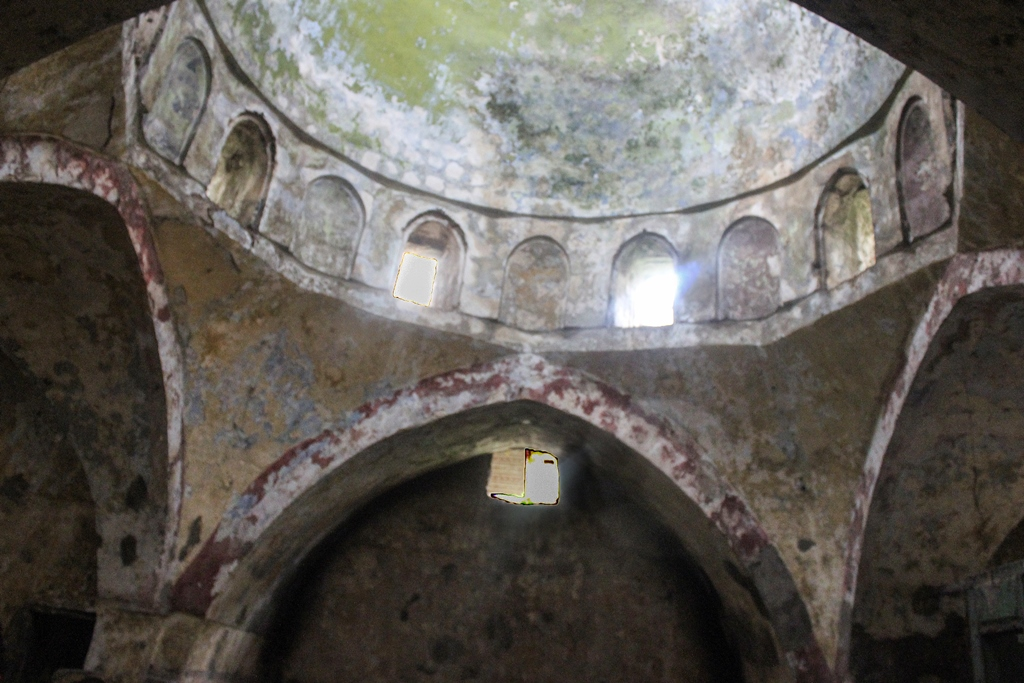
Hammam an-Nuri Tripoli Lebanon

When Tripoli was visited by Ibn Batutah in 1355, he described the newly rebuilt Mamluk city. "Traversed by water-channels and full of' gardens", he writes, "the houses are newly built. The sea lies two leagues distant, and the ruins of the old town are seen on the sea-shore. It was taken by the Franks, but al-Malik ath-Tháhir (Qala'un) retook it from them, and then laid the place in ruins and built the present town. There are fine baths here."

The hammams built in Tripoli by the early Mamluk governors were splendid edifices and many of them survive to the present. Some of the best known are:

- Abed
- Izz El-Din
- Hajeb
- Jadid
- An-Nouri, built 1333 by the Mamluk governor Nur El-Din, is located in the vicinity of the Grand Mosque.

=== Rachid Karami International Fair ===
Rachid Karami International Fair-Tripoli
UNESCO World Heritage Site
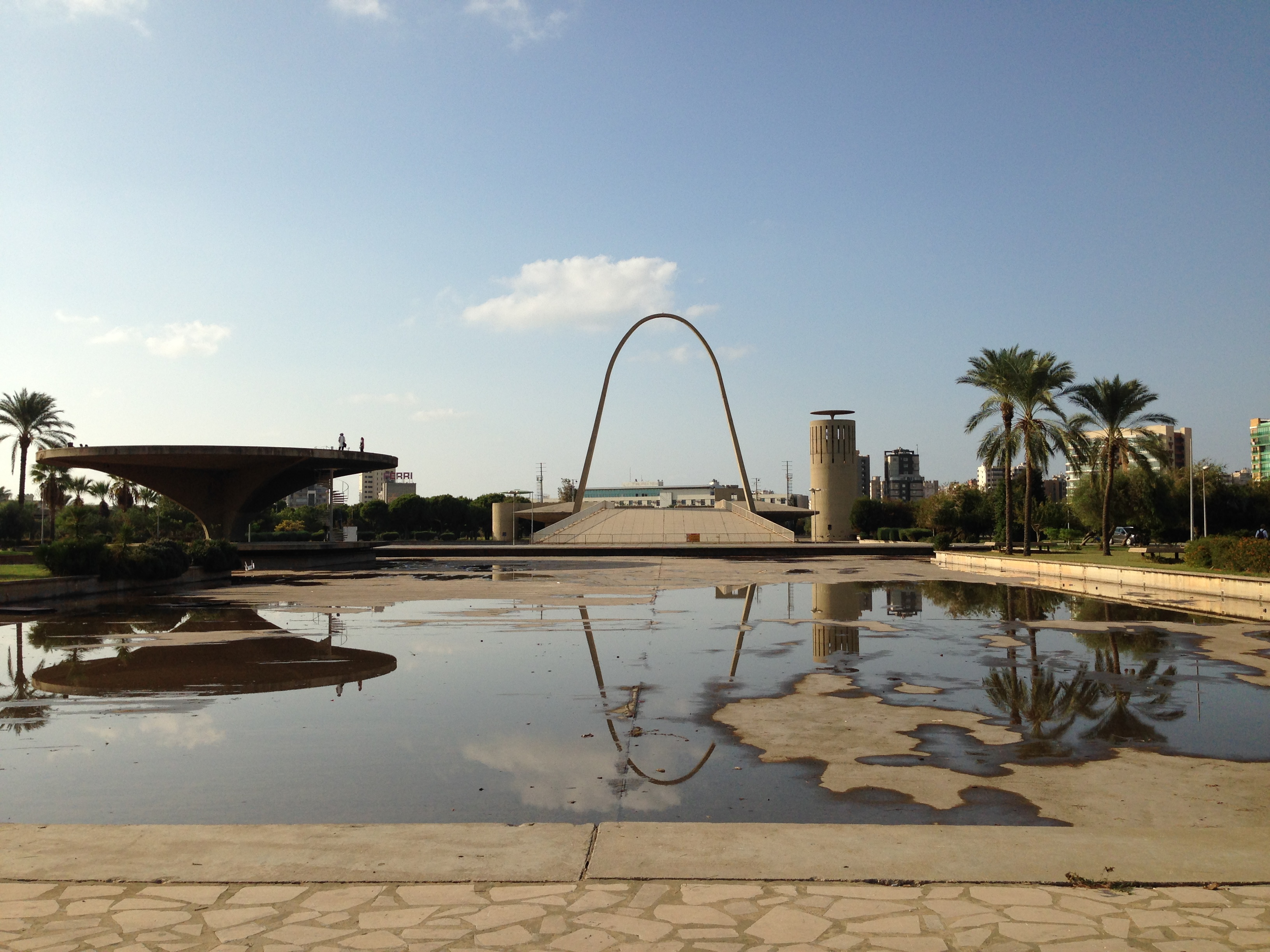
- The helicopter landing apron (left) and the gateway arch to the open-air theatre at the Rashid Karami International Fair
- Interactive map of Rachid Karami International; Fair-Tripoli
- Location: Lebanon
- Criteria: Cultural: ii, iv
- Reference: 1702
- Inscription: 2023 (45th Session)
- Endangered: 2023–present

The International Fair of Tripoli site, formally known as the Rachid Karami International Exhibition Center, is a complex of buildings designed by the Brazilian architect Oscar Niemeyer who was commissioned for the project in 1962. The site was built for a World's Fair event to be held in the city, but construction was halted in 1975 due to the outbreak of the Lebanese civil war, and never resumed. The site contains 15 partly-completed Niemeyer buildings within an approximate 75.6 ha (187-acre) area near Tripoli's southern entrance.

"More recent years have seen the fairground undermined by a mixture of periodic instability and nonsensical administrative procedures that make it virtually impossible to put the facility to use. If the city needed any more physical metaphors for decay, the fairground is flanked by a Quality Inn that is literally falling apart, and whose ownership is years overdue on payment to the site's administrators."

In 2023, the Rashid Karami International Fair was added to both the World Heritage List and the List of World Heritage in Danger.

=== Churches ===
Many churches in Tripoli are a reminder of the history of the city. These churches also show the diversity of Christians in Lebanon and particularly in Tripoli:

- Saint Michael Cathedral of the Maronite Catholic Archeparchy
- St. Elie Greek Orthodox Church
- St. Ephrem Syriac Orthodox Church
- St Francis Roman Catholic Church
- St. Georges Melkite Greek Catholic Cathedral
- Saint Hokekalousd Armenian Orthodox Church
- St. John of the Pilgrims Mount church Maronite Catholic Church
- Our Lady of the Annunciation Melkite Greek Catholic Cathedral
- Then National Evangelical Church

=== Mosques ===
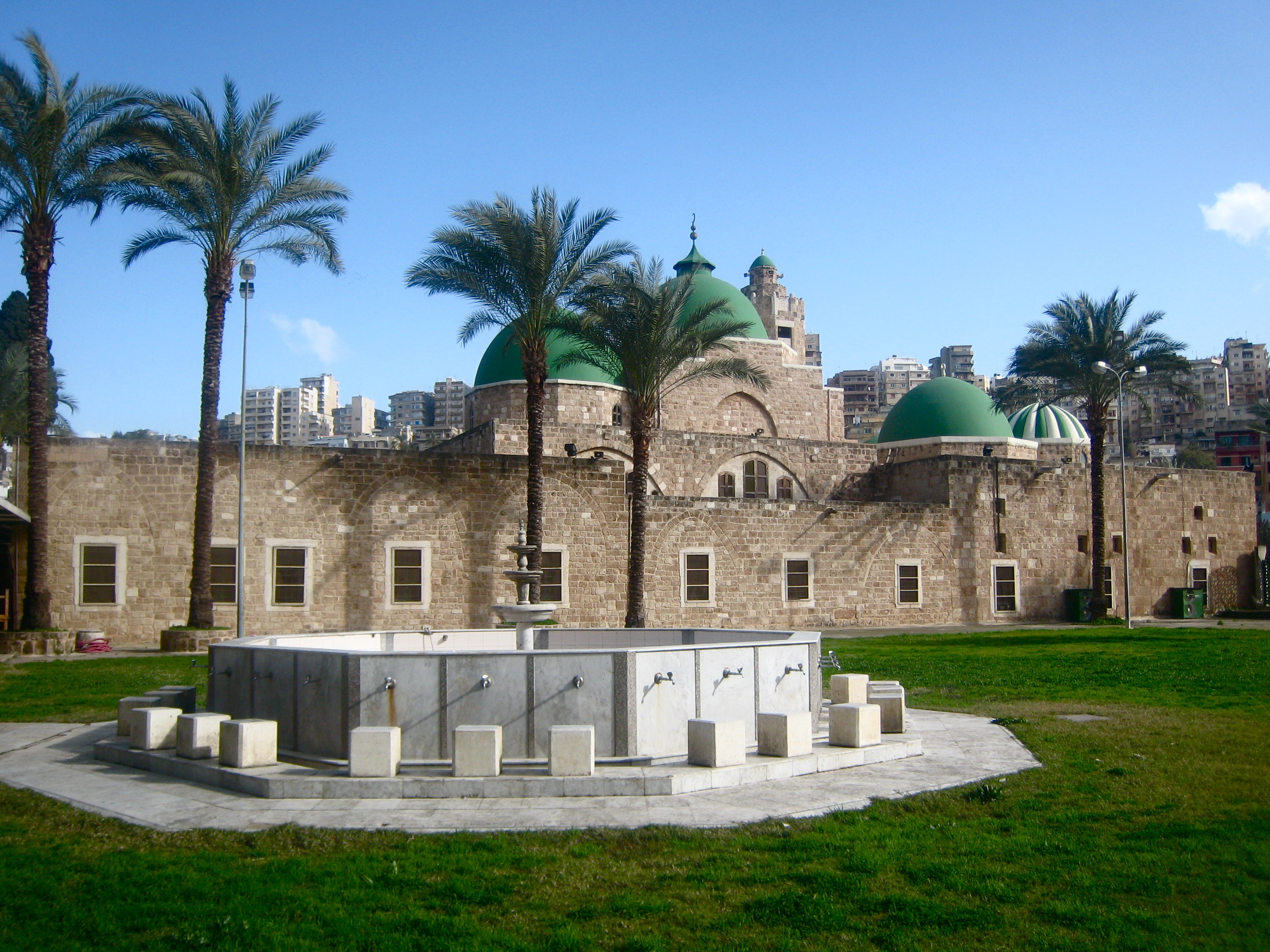
Taynal Mosque built in 1336

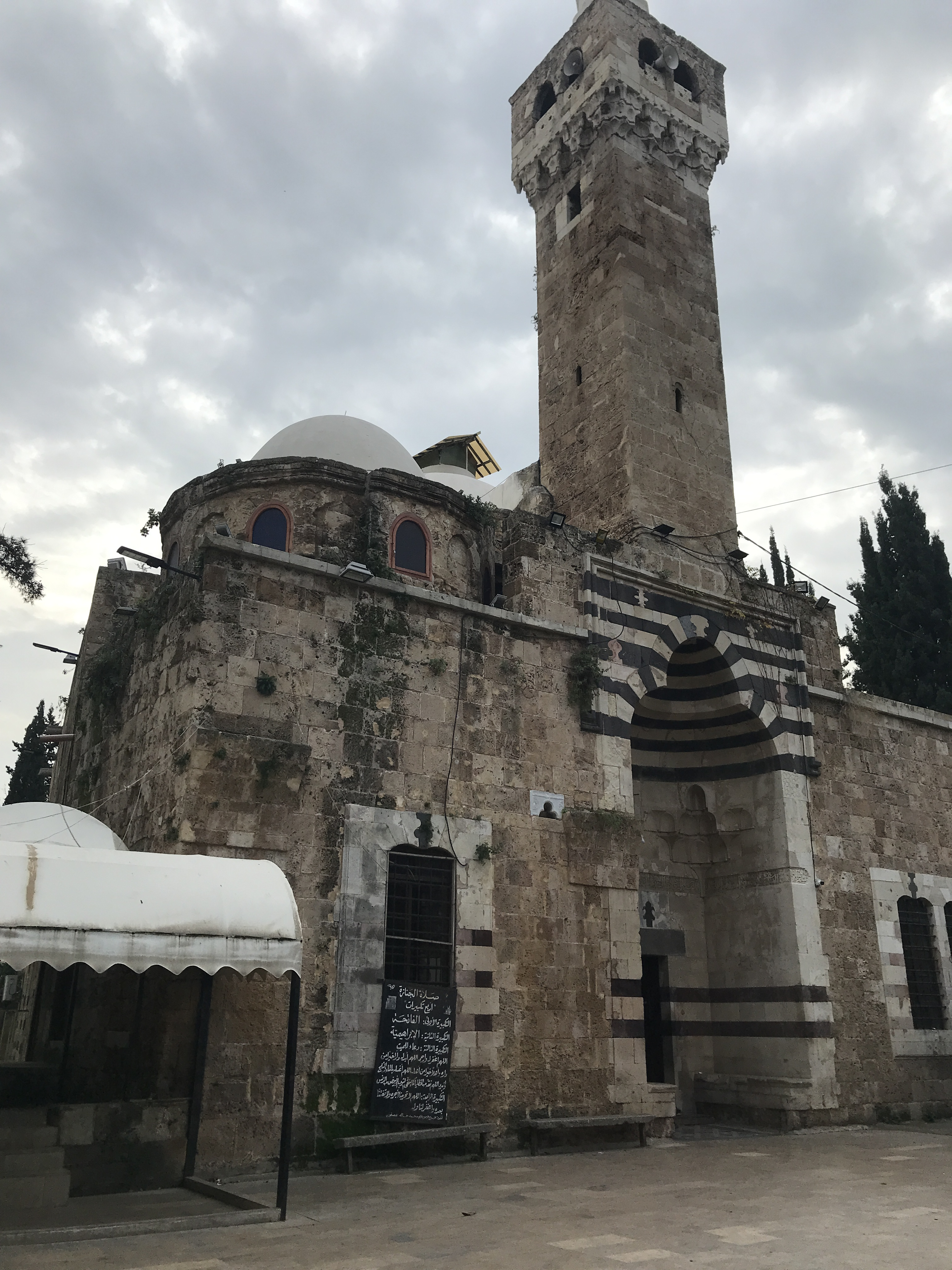
Al-Burtasi Mosque

Tripoli is richly supplied with mosques, In every district of the city there is a mosque, many of which are small. During the Mamluk era, there was an extensive mosque-building program to bolster the new Islamic regime and many still remain until today.

Some of the notable mosques are:

- Al-Attar Mosque
- Abou Bakr Al Siddeeq
- Arghoun Shah
- Al-Burtasi Mosque
- Kabir al Aali
- Mahmoud Beik the Sanjak
- Mansouri Great Mosque
- Omar Ibn El-Khattab Mosque
- Sidi Abdel Wahed
- Tawbah Mosque
- Tawjih Mosque
- Taynal Mosque
- Al Bachir Mosque
- Hamza Mosque
- Al Rahma Mosque
- Al Salam Mosque
- Al Ghandour Mosque
- Al Shokr Mosque
- Zafer Bellah Mosque
- Al Wafaa' Mosque
- Al-Uwaysiyat Mosque
- Mu'allaq Mosque

The Al-Ghuraba cemetery is located within the city.

== Education ==
Universities in Tripoli and
North Lebanon Branches
Legend
(Red colour is only used for clarity)
1 Beirut Arab University (BAU)
2 AZM University
3 University of Tripoli
4 City University
5 Lebanese University
6 Arts, Sciences and Technology University in Lebanon (AUL)
7 Jinan University Lebanon
8 Lebanese International University
9 American University of Technology (AUT)
10 Notre Dame University (NDU)
11 Lebanese-French University of Technology and Applied Sciences (ULF)
12 Saint Joseph University (USJ)
13 University of Balamand
14 Holy Spirit University of Kaslik (USEK)

Tripoli has a large number of schools of all levels, public and private. It is also served by several universities within the city limits as well as in its urban area.

The universities in Tripoli and its metro area are:

- University of Tripoli Lebanon
- The Lebanese University – North Lebanon Branch
- Universite St Joseph – North Lebanon
- Lebanese International University (Dahr el Ein, Just outside the city)
- Al-Manar University of Tripoli (changed to "City University")
- Jinan University
- University of Balamand (Qelhat, in the Koura district, just outside the city)
- Notre Dame University (Barsa, in the Koura district, just outside the city)
- Arts, Sciences and Technology University in Lebanon-North Lebanon Branch
- Beirut Arab University – North Lebanon Branch
- Universite Saint Espirt de Kaslik – Chekka ( Just Outside The City )
- Université de Technologie et de Sciences Appliquées Libano-Française (chamber of commerce)
- Azm university

== Economy ==
Tripoli stands out as one of Lebanon's economically poorest cities, marked by a substantial division between the affluent and poor residents. The city grapples with elevated unemployment rates, and certain impoverished neighborhoods have become strongholds for Islamist and other radical factions.

=== Commerce ===
Tripoli, while once economically comparable to Beirut, has declined in recent decades. Organisations such as the Business Incubation Association in Tripoli (BIAT) are currently trying to revive traditional export businesses such as furniture production, artisanal copper goods, soaps, as well as to expand new industries such as ICT offshore services and new technological applications.

The Tripoli Special Economic Zone (TSEZ) was established in 2008 to provide exemptions from many taxes and duties for investment projects that have more than $300,000 of capital and more than half their workers from Lebanon. It is a 55-hectare site adjacent to the Port of Tripoli.

Recently, a Tripoli development plan called "Tripoli Vision 2020" has been formulated and supported by a number of advisory councils including influential key government officials and prominent businessmen in the city. The goal of the project is to provides a comprehensive framework consisting of promoting investment, investing, training, re-skilling, talent placement and output promotion to reinvigorate the city's economy. The Tripoli Vision 2020 was sponsored by the Prime Minister Saad Hariri Office and the Tripoli MPs Joint Office with the comprehensive study conducted by Samir Chreim of SCAS Inc.

=== Inequality ===
Tripoli is one of the country's most concentrated centers of poverty, it is also the hometown of several wealthy politicians, including Najib Mikati, Taha Mikati and Mohammad Safadi who are accused of accumulating their wealth by embezzling government funds.

=== Khan el-Khayyatin–the Tailors' Khan ===
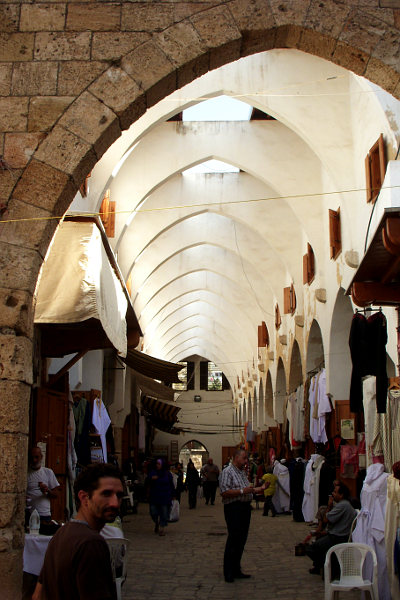
The Tailors' Khan

Unlike other khans built around a square courtyard, el-Khayyatin, built in the 14th century, is a 60 meter long passage with arches on each side.

=== The Soap Khan ===
The khan, built around a square courtyard decorated with a fountain, houses soap making workshops and shops. At the end of the 15th century, the governor of Tripoli Yusuf Sayfa Pasha established Khan Al Saboun (the hotel of soap traders). This market was finished at the beginning of the 16th century, the last days of the Mamluk rule. The raw material used for these kinds of soap is olive oil.

=== Arabic sweets ===
Tripoli is regionally known for its Arabic sweets.

== Environmental issues ==
Lebanese public opinion and Lebanese authorities rarely react to minor oil spills from merchant ships calling at Lebanese ports. Being without inspection, and discharging close to the shore, oil tankers pollute the coast. These pollutions have a direct effect on the marine life.

== International relations ==
=== Twin towns – Sister cities ===
Tripoli is twinned with:

- Naples, Italy
- Larnaca, Cyprus
- Gaziantep, Turkey
- Faro, Portugal
- Toulouse, France
- (United States) Miami, USA
- Ayia Napa, Cyprus

== Notable people ==
- Ezza Agha Malak, novelist, poet, critic, and essayist
- Amar, Lebanese singer
- Rania Attieh, filmmaker
- Miguel Casiri (1710–1791), Spanish academic and orientalist
- Darine (born 1984), Swedish singer-songwriter
- Juliette Elmir, nurse and political activist
- Walid Harfouch
- Joe Hasham, actor
- Agnes Hewes (1874–1963), American children's writer
- Mohammad Jamal (1934–2022), singer, composer, and actor
- Salwa Al Katrib, singer and stage actress
- Samir El-Khadem
- Salim Lawzi (1922–1980), journalist
- Lee Majdoub, actor
- Robert Mardini, humanitarian
- Nadine Merabi
- Azmi Mikati (born 1972), businessman
- Taha Mikati, billionaire
- Muhammad ibn Khalil al-Qawuqji, Hanafi scholar
- Abdel Salam Al Nabulsy, actor
- Nour El-Refai (born 1987), Swedish actress and comedian
- Randa Chahal Sabag (1953–2008), film director
- Leonid Solovyov, writer
- Ahmad Sultan, musical artist
- Habib Tawa, French historian, journalist, and mathematician
- Salah Tizani
- Walid Toufic, musical artist
- Hind Nawfal, Syrian writer
- William of Tripoli, Dominican friar
- Rose al Yusuf, journalist and actress
- Maher Zain, R&B singer
- Aheda Zanetti, fashion designer

=== Politicians ===
- Kheireddine Abdul Wahab
- Abdulhamid Al-Rafiʻi
- Mustapha Adib, academic, diplomat, and politician
- Misbah El-Ahdab, politician
- Ghinwa Bhutto, Pakistani politician
- Mohamad Chatah (1951–2013), economist and diplomat
- Ali Eid, politician
- Rifaat Eid, politician
- Khalil Eideh, Australian politician
- Maurice Fadel (1928–2009), businessman and politician
- Robert Fadel, politician
- Issam Fares, businessman
- Raya Haffar El Hassan, politician
- Nassif Hitti, diplomat and politician
- Samir Jisr, politician
- Abdul Hamid Karami (1890–1950), politician
- Ahmad Karami (1944–2020), politician
- Faisal Karami (born 1971), politician
- Omar Karami, former Primer Minister of Lebanon
- Rashid Karami, politician
- Najib Mikati, former Primer Minister of Lebanon
- Rachid Derbass, politician and former minister of social affairs
- Ahmad Sami Minkara (1937/1938–2023), military officer and politician
- Omar Miskawi (born 1935), lawyer and politician
- Tarek Mitri, statesman and professor
- Saadi Al Munla (1890–1975), politician
- Nicolas Nahas (born 1946), politician
- Abd al-Majid al-Rafei, politician
- Ashraf Rifi, politician
- Mohammad Safadi (born 1944), businessman and politician
- Mükerrem Sarol (1909–1995), Turkish physician and politician
- Fathi Yakan, Islamic cleric

=== Sportspeople ===
- Abdallah Aich (born 1995), footballer
- Mohammad Akkari, basketball player
- Abou Bakr Al-Mel (born 1992), footballer
- Said Ali (born 1980), Jordanian footballer
- Doumouh Al Bakkar (born 1990), football referee
- Aya El Boukhary (born 2002), footballer
- Fayez Chamsine (born 1992), footballer
- Abdul Razzak Dakramanji (born 2001), footballer
- Ramez Dayoub (born 1984), footballer
- Benny Elias, Australia rugby league footballer
- Safwan Khalil, Australian taekwando practitioner
- Hazem El Masri (born 1976), rugby league footballer
- Ahmad Moghrabi (born 1983), footballer
- Akram Moghrabi (born 1985), footballer
- Abdallah Moughrabi (born 1995), footballer
- Bilal El Najjarine (born 1981), footballer
- Rabih Osman, footballer
- Mohamad Omar Sadek (born 2003), footballer
- Nazem Sayad, footballer

== See also ==
- 2019 Tripoli shooting
- Bazaar
- Bazaari
- County of Tripoli
- El Mina
- Krak des Chevaliers
- Market (place)
- Raymond IV of Toulouse
- Siege of Tripoli
