= Palm Islands Nature Reserve =

Islands in Lebanon

- Logo of the reserve
- Interactive map of Palm Islands Nature Reserve
- Location: Mina, Lebanon, Tripoli District, North Governorate, Lebanon
- Coordinates: 34°29′33.85″N 35°46′28.41″E
- Area: 4.2 km^{2} (1.6 sq mi)
- Elevation: 0 m (0 ft)
- Established: 1992
- Governing body: Lebanese Ministry of the Environment

The Palm Islands Nature Reserve consists of three flat, rocky islands of eroded limestone and the surrounding sea area, located 5.5 kilometres (3.4 mi) offshore and northwest of the city of El Mina, Lebanon, to the west of Tripoli, Lebanon.

The overall area of the reserve is 4.2 square kilometres (1.6 sq mi), it has been designated as a Mediterranean Specially Protected Area under the 1995 Barcelona Convention. The islands were also identified as a Ramsar Wetland of Special International Importance in 1980, and have been identified as an Important Bird Area by BirdLife International. The islands are a haven for endangered green turtles (Chelona mydas), rare monk seals and a resting and nesting grounds for migratory birds.

== Islands ==
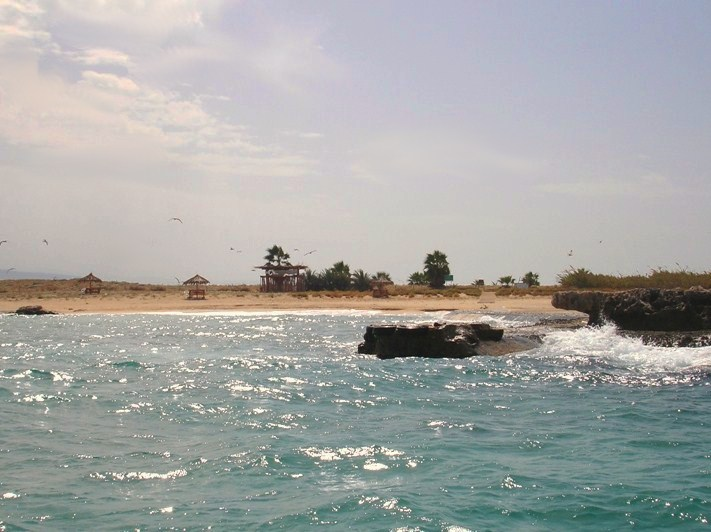
The sandy shores of Palm Island

The largest of the three islands is Palm Island (Arabic: جزيرة النخيل Jazeerat an-Nakheel) also known as Rabbits Island (Arabic: جزيرة الأرانب Jazeerat al-Araneb). The name 'Araneb' (rabbits) comes from the great numbers of rabbits that were raised on the island during the time of the French mandate early in the 20th century. Palm Island is characterized by its flat terrain and has no obvious reliefs, it covers an area of 180,796 square metres (1,946,070 sq ft). The island's highest point is at 6 metres (20 ft) above sea level. It's rocky shoreline extends from the northwest to south while its sandy beaches lay at the northern and eastern faces. The middle of the island is earthen, it contains evidence of past periods of human occupation such as a fresh water well, an old salt evaporation pond and the remains of a Crusader church. The island underwent rehabilitation works which included restoration of the well, its water is used to irrigate the island's 570 palm trees. The authorities also constructed a boat dock and walking trails and demarcated the island's areas of recreation and research.

Sanani Island (Arabic: جزيرة السناني Jazeerat as-Sanani) covers an area of 45,503 square metres (489,790 sq ft) south east of Palm Island. It is mainly rocky with a partially sandy shore.

Ramkine Island (Arabic: جزيرة رمكين Jazeerat Ramkine) also known as Fanar Island (Arabic: جزيرة الفنار Jazeerat al-Fanar) is the smallest of the islands with an area of 34,903 square metres (375,690 sq ft); it is located north west of Palm Island. Ramkine island is mostly rocky and rises to about 12 meters above sea level. The island contains the remains of a lighthouse in addition to cannon emplacements and underground galleries that were built in the early 20th century. A solar powered navigation light has now been installed in the tower of the old lighthouse. The islands are public property, they were declared protected area by law on March 9, 1992.

== History ==
The islands hosted an important settlement as attested by the presence of numerous ostraca dating to the late Roman and medieval periods as well as several rock-cut cisterns. The first excavation of Palm Island was undertaken in October 1973 and revealed the foundations of several buildings dating to the Crusades in which earlier architectural elements, such as column drums and fragments of capitals had been re-used.

Among the medieval sources that make mention of the offshore isles of Tripoli is the Arab geographer Idrisi who visited the city during the twelfth century at the time when it was ruled by Raymond III; Idrisi wrote:

Opposite the city of Tripoli are four islands in a row. The first of them, and nearest to the land, is the Narcissus Isle (an -Narjis); it is very small and is unoccupied. Then comes the Isle of the Column (al-tantid), then Monk’s Isle (ArRahib), and then the Isle of Ardhakun (or Udhákun).

The Crusaders built a church upon the largest island. It was there that Alice of Champagne, the widow of Hugh I of Cyprus came in 1224 to marry Bohemond V of Antioch. The royal wedding took place in this church which we are told by Arab chroniclers was dedicated to Thomas the Apostle. Years later the island became the scene of a bloody massacre; when the Mamelukes entered Tripoli in 1289 the panic-stricken inhabitants fled to the port and crossed over to the island. Many took refuge in the church where they were put to death when the Mamelukes caught up with them. The island was afterwards abandoned for many years.

At present the Palm Islands are managed and monitored daily by the Mina City Environment Protection Committee and its team with two rangers keeping intruders at bay. The islands were first open to the public in 1999. The islands are only open to the public between July and September though they may be closed during this period if environmental work or studies are being undertaken. Ferries, operated by local fishermen, assure the transport of visitors from the Mina ports to the Islands.

== Geology and pedology ==
There are two theories regarding the geological origins of the islands bedrock, the rocky basement of the islands is mainly horizontally bedded marine limestone, it was interpreted as Miocene deposits. However, since no tectonic features are visible in the limestone to distinguish it from the Miocene limestone of the Lebanese mainland, with the lack of fossil evidence, and with its regular sedimentation, this limestone could be interpreted to be more likely from the Plio-Quaternary age. Geomorphologically, marine and emerged aerial erosion give the limestone its typical karstic features. Open gutters can be seen, wide and open in the case of marine erosion, narrower in higher places due to aerial and marine erosion. All around the islands there are bare rocky exposures as a result of marine erosion in the form of dissolution and physical action of the waves. During the winter diaclases and pools within the dunes fill with fresh water which remains available even in the summer. The sandy shore and dunes of two of the islands are of a biological origin. It is mostly constituted by the skeletons of marine foraminifera, resulting in very light sand mixed with fragments of gastropod shells and parts of skeletons and spines of echinoderms. Sand dunes form the higher parts of Palm Island and are the location of evidence of human occupation.

Orthent, is found on the rocky parts of the islands; this exceedingly shallow soil hosts ephemeral flora that grows during the wet seasons and when fresh water accumulate in the rocky crevasses. Soils with more horizon development are found in the western parts of Palm Island, it is mainly formed by aeolian and beach deposited calcareous sand.

== Threats ==
The Jiyeh Power Station oil spill disturbed the fragile ecosystem of the reserve. Oil coated the shores, killing microorganism and algae, and floated on the surface of the water, presenting a danger to turtles and migrating birds. Large quantities of oil sank to the sea bed. A clean-up and monitoring program was undertaken by the International Union for Conservation of Nature to minimize the harm.
