= City University of Tripoli =

Private university in Lebanon

Coordinates: 33°53′59.87″N 35°28′56.22″E

City University ( Rashid Karami Institution for Higher Education)
- جامعة المدينة في طرابلس
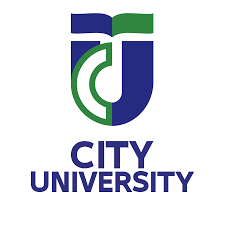
- Type: Private
- Established: 15 November 1990; 35 years ago
- President: Dr. Walid Dagher
- Students: 2,370
- Location: Tripoli, Lebanon
- Campus: 255,000 m^{2} (2,740,000 sq ft); Urban
- Website: cityu.edu.lb

City University (جامعة المدينة), previously known as Al-Manar University of Tripoli (MUT; Arabic: جامعة المنار في طرابلس), also known as the Rashid Karami Institution for Higher Education, is a private accredited university located in Tripoli, Lebanon. The university was founded on 15 November 1990 by Presidential Decree No. 720.

== History ==
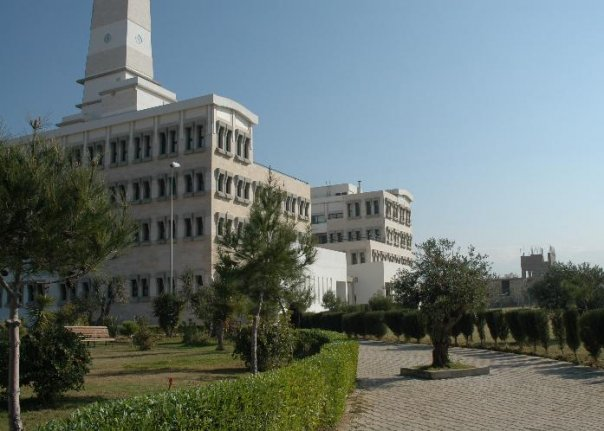
Administration Building 2006

The City University (CITYU)'s establishment was first proposed in 1985, when the late Prime Minister Rashid Karami collaborated with educator Muhieddin Makkouk and a group of Tripoli citizens on a project to meet the educational concerns of North Lebanon. In 1986 they established the "Al-Manar Society", a non-profit organization dedicated to providing quality education to students of North Lebanon and other regions of the Arab World.

After the assassination of Rashid Karami, Prime Minister Omar Karami assumed the Chairmanship of "Al-Manar Society", and formed the first University Board of Trustees in 1990. The Board was chaired by Karami and involved 18 other members from Lebanon and the Arab World. MUT's current president is Dr. Walid Dagher.

In 2017, a new presidential decree no. 1908 was published to reflect the university's new educational identity, renaming it City University and changing its name from Al-Manar University of Tripoli.

== Faculties ==
=== Faculty of Architecture and Design (FAD) ===
The FAD building has a floor area of 3300 m^{2} and has a capacity of 550 students. FAD offers degrees in the following majors:

- Architecture
- Graphic Design
- Interior Design
- Furniture Design
- Photography
- Industrial Design
- Studio Arts

=== Faculty of Arts & Human Science ===
The faculty building has a floor area of 1670 m^{2} and capacity for 420 students. Faculty of Arts & Human Science offers degrees in the following majors:

- Arabic Language and Literature
- French Language and Literature
- English Language and Literature
- Psychology
- Sociology
- Philosophy
- Elementary Education
- Translation

=== Faculty of Business Administration ===
The faculty building has 1570 m^{2} of floor space and capacity for 400 students. Faculty of Business Administration offers degrees in the following majors:

- Management
- Marketing
- Finance
- Accounting
- Economics
- Islamic Banking and Finance
- Management Information System
- Hospitality & Tourism Management

=== Faculty of Engineering and Information Technology (FEIT) ===
The Faculty was established in 2007. Currently directed by Dr. Hiba Al Sheikh. The faculty building has 2100 m^{2} of floor space and capacity for 350 students. FEIT offers undergraduate degrees, BSc and Engineering Diplomas in the following majors:

- Electronics and Computer Engineering (ECE)
- Communication and Network Engineering (CNE)
- Industrial Engineering (IE)
- Biomedical Engineering (BME)
- Information Technology (IT)
- Computer Science (CS)
- Civil and Environmental (CIV)
- Marine Transport and Technology (MTT)
- Marine Engineering and Technology (MET)

=== Faculty of Public Health ===
The building has 2720 m^{2} of floor space and capacity for 350 students. This faculty offers degrees in the following majors:

- Nutrition
- Nursing
- Public Health

=== Faculty of Science ===
The building has 1800 m^{2} of floor space and capacity for 300 students. This faculty offers degrees in the following majors:

- Mathematics
- Biology
- Physics
- Chemistry

=== Faculty of Agriculture ===
This faculty was established in 2007.

== IEP - Intensive English Program ==
The Intensive English Program (IEP) helps students to master English language writing, reading, listening, and grammar skills. Course participation is determined by an English Entrance Exam test (similar to "Triple E"), used to assign students to ability-level classes from Level One to the Level Nine TOEFL Level.
