= Ahmad Sultan =

- Born: Tripoli, lebanon
- Occupations: Singer; songwriter
- Years active: 2016–present
- Musical career
- Genre: Pop
- Instruments: Vocals, Guitar, drums, banjo, violin, harmonica, accordion, synthesizer
- Label: Ajami Records
- Website: facebook.com/AhmadSultanOfficial

Ahmad Sultan (Arabic: أحمد سلطان), is a Lebanese singer, musician, and songwriter. whose diverse vocal ability and style has attracted a following from different countries in the Arab world. Sultan started his music career at a young age; in 2017 he released his first single Khent El Alb.

== Discography ==
=== Singles ===
- Khent El Ab (2017)
- Tofle (2016)

== Videography ==
Official music videos
Year	Title	Album	Director
2017	Khent El Alb	Single	Zak Zakareya
