= Tripoli University Institute for Islamic Studies =

Private university in Tripoli, Lebanon

Coordinates: 34°25′15″N 35°51′08″E

University of Tripoli Lebanon جامعة طرابلس - لبنان
- Type: Private
- Established: 1982; 44 years ago
- President: Raafat Mikati
- Location: Tripoli, Lebanon
- Campus: Tripoli
- Website: Official website

The University of Tripoli (UT; Arabic: جامعة طرابلس) is a private independent university in Tripoli, Lebanon, founded by the Islah Islamic Association.

== History ==
The Tripoli University Institute for Islamic Studies was founded in 1982, the first Islamic institution of higher education in Lebanon, officially licensed by the Ministry of Education and Higher Education in Lebanon's Decree 1736, dated 14 April 2009.

== Faculties ==
The university has three faculties, for Sharia and Islamic Studies, Business Administration and Arts and Human Sciences.

== Certification ==
The university is certificated and recognized in: Lebanon, Syria, Jordan and Egypt.
