= Al-Ghuraba cemetery =

Cemetery in Tripoli, Lebanon

- Interactive map of Al-Ghuraba cemetery

Details
- Location: Tripoli
- Country: Lebanon
- Coordinates: 34.4434°N 35.8462°E
- Type: Public

Al-Ghuraba cemetery is a cemetery in Tripoli, Lebanon. It has been used in the past for mass burials relating to the Lebanese Civil War and the 2007 Lebanon conflict. Since the 1970s the cemetery has been occupied by a number of makeshift homes and, in 2010, had a population of 1,000 people. In 2015 the housing condition was reported to be poor by Care International.

== Burials ==
Al-Ghuraba cemetery is located near to the Bab-al-Tibbaneh and Jabal Mohsen neighbourhoods of Tripoli. The name means "strangers" in Lebanese Arabic.

The cemetery has been used for mass burials of those killed in conflict. Amnesty International reported in 1989 that up to 200 men, women and children who were killed in Bab-al-Tibbaneh on 21 and 22 December 1986 may have been buried in a mass grave in the cemetery, excavated by bulldozer. Some of those killed were civilians caught in a crossfire during the Lebanese Civil War but others are alleged to have been Sunni Muslims summarily executed by Syrian troops and their allies. On 4 October 2007 some 98 bodies were buried in the cemetery by the Lebanese government. These were alleged to have been the unclaimed bodies of Fatah al-Islam members killed during the 2007 Lebanon conflict.

== Residents ==
Tripoli saw an influx of low-income migrants in the 1970s and 80s, lacking proper homes many chose to settle at the cemetery. A 2010 Tripoli municipal study found some 1,000 residents, from 187 families, still living there in makeshift, self-built homes. A rising birth rate meant that the population was expected to increase. Despite influxes of Syrian refugees during the Syrian Civil War the majority of residents were of Lebanese origin. The land is largely state-owned, with a portion owned, under mortmain, by a mosque and there are occasional land disputes between the owners and occupants.

A 2015 report by the British branch of Care International reported poor living conditions with 20% living below the Sphere standards for covered living space. The houses are often of single-room, single-storey construction and many families lack any furniture. Walls, roofs and foundations are often lacking and the houses are damp and cold in winter. Although the municipal authorities allowed the installation of some electricity supplies basic infrastructure remains poor and sanitation is by means of open sewer. There is poor access to water with 60% of toilet facilities lacking a sink with running water and three quarters of toilets lacking a door. Incomes are low, though many families earn money by helping to bury the dead, despite being stigmatised for this. Many of the children of the area do not attend school. The municipal authorities have made plans to improve living conditions, including by constructing a new residential complex nearby.

Some houses in the area were damaged by mortar fire during the Bab al-Tabbaneh–Jabal Mohsen conflict. The inhabitants of Al-Ghuraba appeared in the 2007 documentary film The Strangers.
