= Jinan University Lebanon =

Private university in Lebanon

- جامعة الجنان
- Type: Private, Nonprofit
- Established: 1988; 38 years ago
- President: Abed Yakan
- Students: 2000
- Location: Tripoli, Lebanon; 34°24′35″N 35°50′48″E
- Campus: Tripoli Campus Saïda Campus
- Website: jinan.edu.lb

Jinan University Lebanon (Arabic: جـامعة الجنان) is a private nonprofit institution of higher education with campuses located in the cities of Tripoli and Saïda in Lebanon, West Asia.

== History ==
Jinan University is one of several educational institutions working under the umbrella of the Jinan Association, which operates primary schools, high schools, schools for people with special needs, and technical institutes active since year 1964. Jinan University was established in year 1988 and received its official authorization from the Lebanese Ministry of Higher Education in year 1991. In 1999, Jinan University was officially licensed by the Lebanese Ministry of Higher Education. In addition, Jinan University has published a number of scientific articles, as in the case of partnership with the University of Damascus and the International Private University for Science and Technology, such as oncology research and research by gifted students.

== Faculties ==
Jinan University has the following operating faculties and institutes:

1. Faculty of Literature and Humanities (1999-)
2. Faculty of Business Administration (1999-)
3. Faculty of Communication (1999-)
4. Faculty of Public Health (1999-)
5. Faculty of Education (2010-)
6. Faculty of Sciences (2012-)
7. Political Science Institute (2015-)

== List of Academic Agreements ==
Herein, is a list of universities and institutions with which Jinan University has signed cooperative agreements:

1. Albert Haykal Hospital (Nursing Education Partnership Program)
2. Saydet Zgharta Hospital (Public Health Research Partnership Program)
3. Orange-Nassau Hospital (Management and Nursing Education Partnership Program)
4. AlZahraa Hospital (Nursing Education Partnership Program)
5. Holy Spirit University of Kaslik (Professional Standards Framework for Excellence in Teaching and Learning in Lebanese Universities; co-funded by the Erasmus+ Programme of the European Union)

== Membership ==
- Union of Arab Universities.
- Association of Islamic Universities.
- Universities Association of Lebanon (UAOLB)
- The Arab organization of the Registrars in the Universities of Arab Countries.
- Union of Arab and European universities.
- Association of communication faculties in Arab Universities.
- Assembly of Registrars in Lebanese Private Universities.
- The Agency of French-speaking Universities (AUF-Agence Universitaire de la Francophonie).
