= Tripoli railway station =

Railway station in Tripoli, Lebanon

Coordinates: 34°26′56″N 35°49′41″E

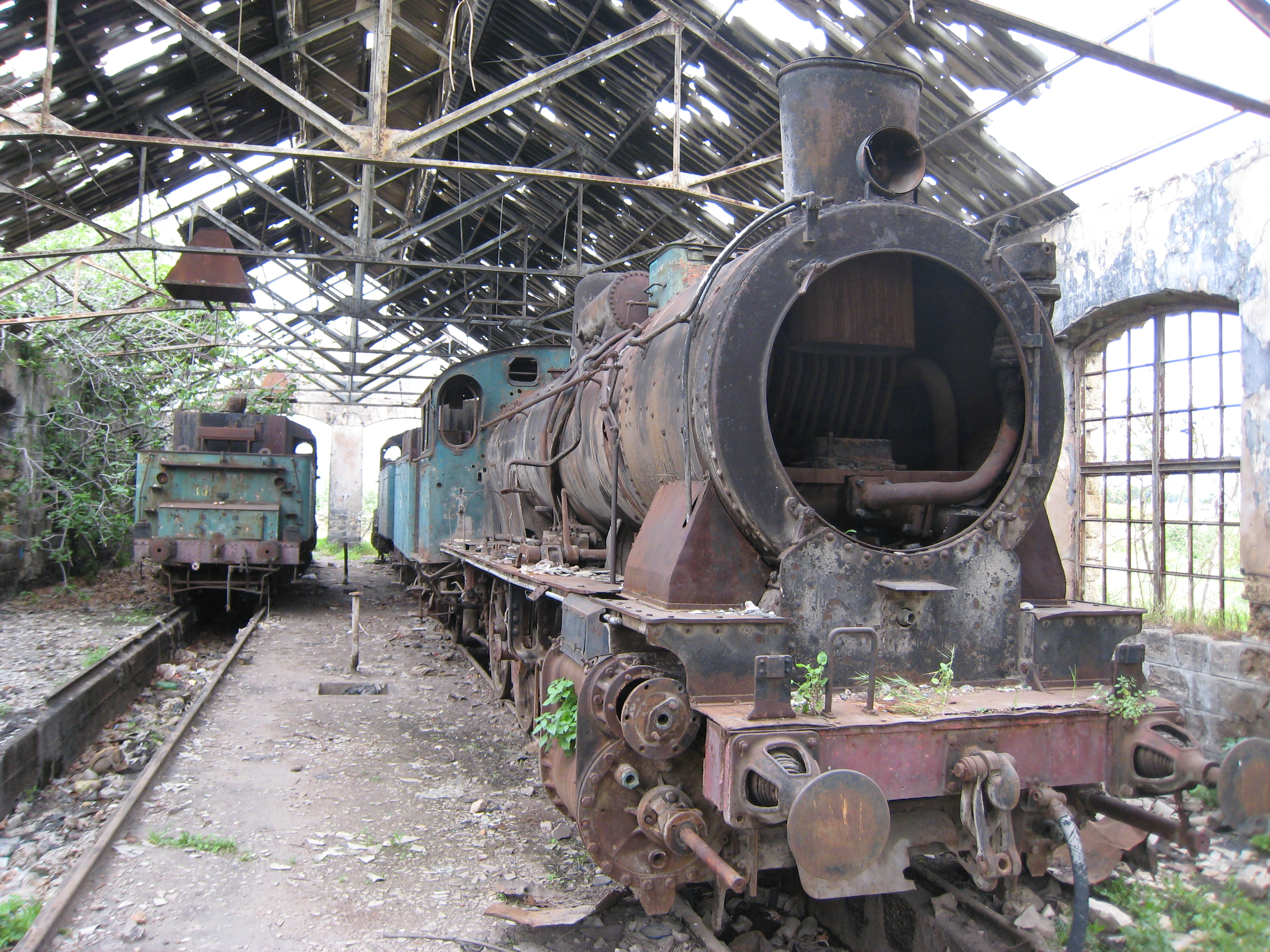
- Steam locomotives in the rail depot of Tripoli station

General information
Location

The Tripoli railway station is located in El-Mina, Tripoli, Lebanon. It began operating in 1911 and was connected to the Syrian city, Homs, with a single track. Tripoli station was connected to the central station of Beirut (Mar Mikael) in 1945.

== Overview ==
During World War I, the Ottomans, for military reasons, damaged the Tripoli-Homs line. Ruined, the station was nationalized in 1920 at the time of the French mandate in Lebanon and Syria. In 1943, after independence, the station became the property of the Lebanese state.

In 1975, the station was abandoned and now contains a number of multipurpose buildings. These buildings were severely damaged during the civil war (1975–1991). A series of ancient multi-purpose wagons, two German G7 class locomotives made in 1895, and four German G8 locomotives, made in 1901 and 1906 remain on the site. The traces of war are visible on the vehicles. In June 2011, the station reopened its doors to visitors for two days only.
