= Robert Fadel =

Lebanese politician (born 1970)

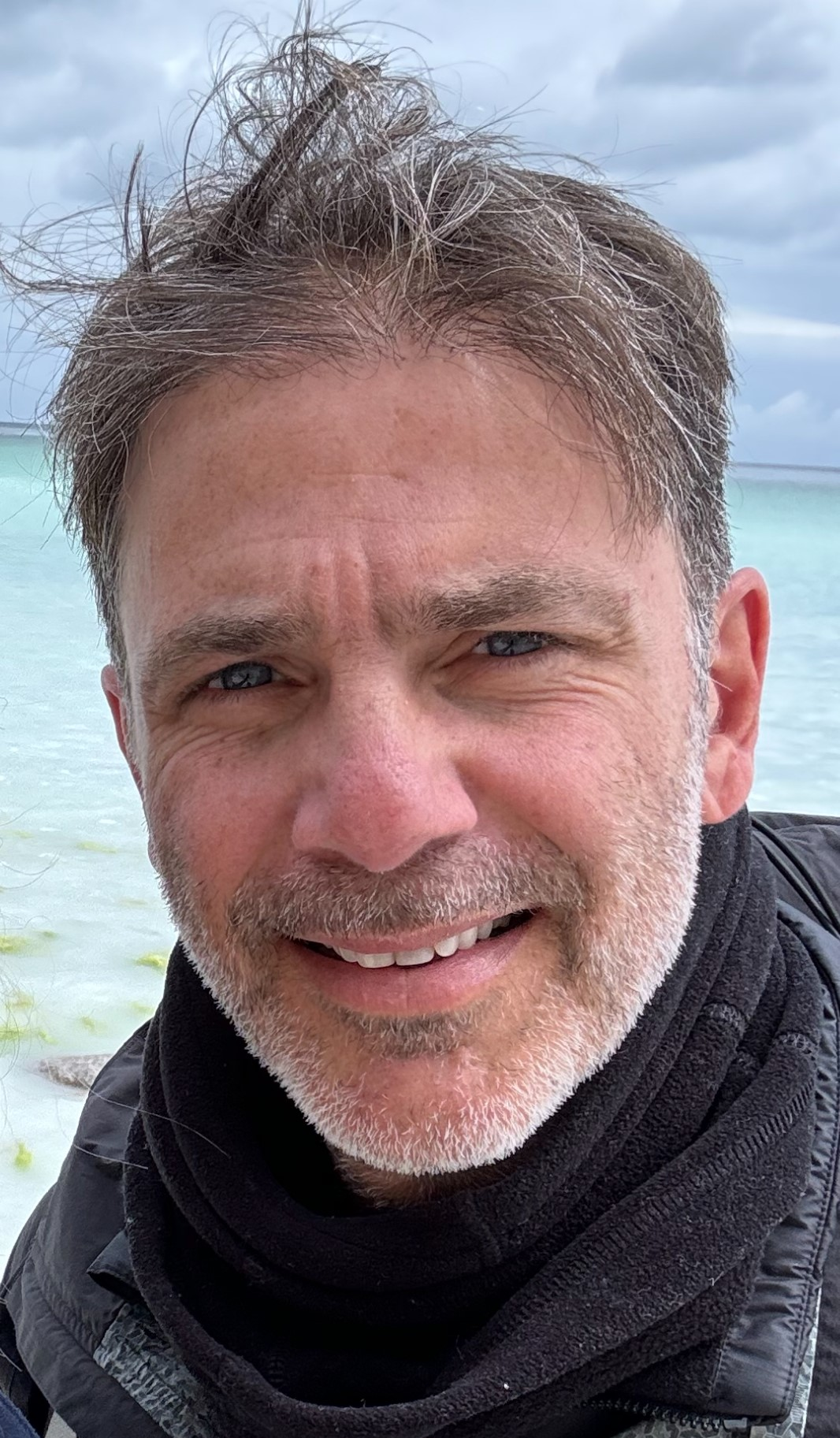
Fadel in 2024

Robert Fadel (Arabic: روبير فاضل) (born 12 January 1970) is a Lebanese politician and businessman.

== Political career ==
Fadel started his political career as a delegation member to the 1989 Taef conference that ended Lebanon’s 15-year civil war. He was later elected as an independent member of the Lebanese Parliament Lebanese Parliament in 2009, representing Tripoli and succeeding his father, Maurice Fadel. Fadel was notably part of the March 14 coalition, which was significant in post-civil war Lebanon for its advocacy of sovereignty against Syrian and Iranian influence. He resigned from his parliamentary seat in 2016, in protest against corruption, lack of reforms, and the absence of sectarian diversity in local governance. This act of resignation made Fadel the first MP to step down in response to Lebanon's political crisis before Lebanon’s economic collapse of 2019.

In 2016, he co-founded Kulluna Irada.

== Business leadership ==
Fadel is best known for his leadership at ABC Group, one of Lebanon's leading retail and real estate companies. He was Chairman and CEO from 2009 to 2017. His tenure is documented in the Harvard Business School case "From Beirut with Love", which explores his strategies in navigating family business dynamics and the volatile Lebanese market.

== Social impact ==
Fadel founded Bader in 2005, an NGO aimed at supporting young Lebanese entrepreneurs and reducing brain drain in Lebanon. He also established the Maurice Fadel Prize, in 2010 to honor his late father.

== International engagement ==
Fadel has been on the board of the International Crisis Group. His work with this organization included efforts in Venezuela, between Saudi Arabia and Iran, showcasing his role as a mediator in global politics.

He is currently involved with InterMediate, a UK based conflict resolution organization founded by Jonathan Powell.

== Personal life ==
Fadel has three children; he was married to Hala Frangie from 1999 to 2021.

Fadel has a master's degree in finance and economics from the Paris Institute of Political Studies and a postgraduate degree in Public Administration from France's National School of Administration (ENA), where he also chaired the Global Alumni Association in 2000 and helped establish an ENA school in Lebanon. Additionally, he co-authored the book Regards sur la France.
