= Abdulhamid Al-Rafiʻi =

Lebanese poet, writer, journalist and politician

- Born: March 1851; Tripoli
- Died: 22 April 1932 (aged 81); Tripoli Lebanon (1920–1932)
- Occupations: writer, poet, journalist, politician
- Awards: Lebanese Order of Merit

Abdulhamid bin Abdul Ghani Al-Rafiʻi Al-Farouki (Arabic: عبد الحميد بن عبد الغني الرافعي الفاروقي; 1851–1932) was a Lebanese poet, writer, journalist and politician.

== Career ==
He was born in Tripoli, Syria on the 5th of Sha’ban of 1275 AH (March 5,1851 CE). His father was one of the leading scholars of Tripoli who nurtured him during his upbringing, he then studied in Tripoli's schools, then he studied under sheikh Husain Al-Gisr for four years. He attended rhetoric classes at Sheikh Mahmoud Nashabh’ circle. He then left for Egypt and received a five-year education from the scholars of Al-Azhar Mosque where he excelled in Arabic sciences and literature. He studied law in Istanbul, where he worked as an editor in the Arab journal of Moderation (Arabic: Jaredat Al-E’tidal Al’arabiyah) alongside Hassan Al-Tawerani.

He returned to Tripoli, and entered in the service of the state and was appointed as an interrogator, he stayed there for 10 years and then moved to Benghazi, then transferred to Astana (Istanbul) where he was assigned to the Ministry of interior and was appointed as a lieutenant in Nazareth District, and he transferred through the Administrative jobs for 20 years, he gained the second order because of his good services and retired in 1914.

He was subjected to the indignation of the Turkish government during the first world war because his son escaped the compulsory military service, he was exiled to Medina then transferred to Kirklareli in Anatolia, he remained exiled for one year and three months.

He was called (Syria's Bulbul) (Arabic: bulbul Siria), and a ceremony was held to honor him by the Lebanese government in which he was awarded the Lebanese order of Merit, and famous Arab scholars and poets participated in the ceremony, including: Shakib Arsalan, Khalil Matran, as well as Ahmed Shouqi with a poet he sent to the ceremony.

== Works ==
Abdulhamid Al-Rafi’i's collection of poems

- (Arabic title: Diwan Abdulhamid Al-Rafi’i), Printed in Baghdad.
- (Arabic title: Al-Aflath Al-Zabirdagiyah fi Mad’h Al-Otra Al-Ahmadiyah).
- (Arabic title: Al-Madaeh Al-Rafa’iyah).
- (Arabic title: Madaeh Al-Bayt Al-Sayadi).
- (Arabic title: Al-Minhal Al-Asfa fi Kawatir Al-Minfa).

== Death ==
He died on Friday the 16thof Dul-Hijjah, 1350 AH (22 April 1932 CE). He was buried in the family cemetery in Tripoli.
