= Maurice Fadel =

Lebanese businessman and politician (1928–2009)

- Born: Maurice Habib Fadel; 9 February 1928; Tripoli, Lebanon
- Died: June 2009 (aged 80–81)
- Occupations: Merchant, Parliament member, Deputy
- Spouse: Diana Rachid Sfeir
- Children: 4, including Robert

Maurice Habib Fadel (Arabic: موريس حبيب فاضل; 1928–2009) was a Lebanese businessman and politician. He was the chair of the ABC Group and served at the Lebanese Parliament for four terms representing Tripoli.

== Early life ==
Fadel was born in Tripoli on 9 February 1928. He hailed from an Orthodox family. His father was Habib Georges Fadel.

== Career ==
Fadel was the chairman of the ABC Group which is a retail and real estate company. It was founded by him and his wife, Diana Rachid Sfeir, in 1972. Fadel was a member of the Merchants' Association and became a member of its board in 1994. However, he and other two Christian merchants resigned from the board membership immediately after the elections arguing that the national balance of the membership was violated.

Fadel was elected to the Parliament in 1972 from Tripoli. He won his seat in the elections in 1996 and 2000. He was also elected as a Tripoli deputy in the general election in 2005.

== Personal life and death ==
Fadel married Diana Rachid Sfeir on 4 March 1967, and they had four sons. One of his sons, Robert was also elected as a deputy from Tripoli in 2009.

Maurice Fadel died in June 2009.

== Legacy ==
Robert Fadel established a prize, Maurice Fadel Prize, in memory of him.
