= Hala Fadel =

- Born: 29 April 1974 (age 51)

Hala Fadel is an international investor and a managing partner at Eurazeo, a venture capital firm based in Paris and London. She is also the founder and chair of the MIT Enterprise Forum of the pan-Arab region.

Fadel graduated from HEC Paris in 1997 with a Masters in Financial Economics. She received an M.B.A. from the MIT Sloan, also attended the Haas School of Business.
