= Abdul Wahhab =

Abdul Wahhab (Arabic: عبد الوهاب, romanized: ʻAbd al-Wahhāb) is a masculine given name and surname of Arabic origin. It is built from the Arabic words ʻabd and al-Wahhāb, one of the names of God in the Qur'an, which give rise to the Muslim theophoric names. It means "servant of the all-giver". The letter a of the al- is unstressed, and can be transliterated by almost any vowel, often by u. The last element may appear as Wahab, Wahhab, Vehhab, Ouahab, and others with the whole name subject to variable spacing and hyphenation. Notable people with the name include:

== Given name ==
- Abd al-Wahhab Adarrak (1666–1746), Moroccan physician and poet
- Abd al-Wahab ibn Muhammad al-Muntasir, 9th-century Abbasid prince and son of caliph Al-Muntasir
- Abd al-Wahhab Al-Bayati (1926–1999), Iraqi poet
- Abd al-Wahhab Khan Asaf al-Dowleh (1826–1887), Iranian statesman and minister
- Abd al-Wahhab Hawmad (1915–2002), Syrian politician
- Abd al-Wahhab al-Humayqani (born 1972), Yemeni politician
- Abd al-Wahhab ibn Abd al-Rahman (747/48–824), founder of the Wahbi Ibadism movement
- ʿAbd al-Wahhāb ibn Aḥmad aš-Šaʿrānī, known as just Shaʿrānī (1492–1565), Egyptian Sufi teacher
- Abd al-Wahab al-Shawaf (1916–1959), Iraqi revolutionary
- Abd al-Wahhab Abu Zayd (born 1970), Saudi translator and poet
- Abdelwahab Abdallah (born 1940), Tunisian politician and diplomat
- Abdelwahab Bekli (1940–2026), Algerian politician
- Abdelwahab Benmansour (1920–2008), Moroccan historian and civil servant
- Abdel Wahab el-Beshry, Egyptian politician
- Abdelwahab Bouhdiba (1932–2020), Tunisian academic
- Abdelwahab Doukkali (1941–2026), Moroccan composer and performer
- Abdel Wahab Elmessiri (1938–2008), Egyptian political philosopher
- Abdelwahab Ferguène (born 1958), Algerian racewalker
- Abdel Wahab al-Hamadi (born 1979), Kuwaiti writer
- Abdelwahab Meddeb (1946–2014), Tunisian writer
- Abdel Wahab Qaid (born 1967/68), Libyan politician
- Abdel Wahab Abdullah Salih (born 1946), Sudanese boxer
- Abdolvahab Shahidi (1922–2021), Iranian singer and barbat player
- Abdolvahab Shahkhoreh (1936–2006), Iranian sprinter
- Abdulvehab Ilhamija (1773–1821), Bosnian Dervish and writer
- Abdul Wahab, known as Sachal Sarmast (1739–1829), Sindhi Sufi poet
- Abdul Wahab (Awami League politician) (died 2011), Bangladeshi politician
- Abdul Wahab (educationist) (1939–2016), Pakistani educationist
- Abdul Wahab (Jhenaidah politician), Bangladeshi politician
- Abdul Wahab (journalist) (1916–1994), Bangladeshi journalist
- Abdul Wahab (Mughal historian) (died 1622/23), Indian Mughal historian
- Abdul Wahab (officer) (died 1999), Pakistani army officer
- Abdul Wahab Adam (1938–2014), Ghanaian Muslim Scholar and Ameer of the Ahmadiyya movement, Ghana
- Abdulwahab Alamrani (born 1958), Yemeni diplomat
- Abdul Wahab Ali (born 1958), Iraqi table tennis player
- Abduwahap Aniwar (born 2000), Chinese footballer
- Abdulwahab Al-Awadi (born 2002), Kuwaiti footballer
- AbdulWahab al-Awdi (born 1978), Yemeni poet
- Abdulwahab Al-Babtain (born 1985), Kuwaiti politician
- Abdul Wahab Al-Dailami (1938–2021), Yemeni politician
- Abdul Wahab Dalimunthe (1939–2021), Indonesian bureaucrat and politician
- Abdul Wahab Dar (born 1993), Pakistani cricketer
- Abdulwahab Darawshe (1943–2026), Israeli Arab politician
- Abdul-Wahab Abu Al-Hail (born 1976), Iraqi footballer
- Abdulwahab Al-Hamwi (born 1990), Syrian basketball player
- Abdul Wahab Hasbullah (1889–1971), Indonesian Islamic leader
- Abdul-Wahab Hawmad (1915–2002), Syrian politician
- Abdulwahab Hussain (born 1954), Bahraini political activist
- Abdulwahab Jaafer (born 1993), Saudi footballer
- Abdul Wahab Joardar, Bangladeshi army officer
- Abdul Wahab Juned (born 1949), Bruneian politician
- Abdul Wahab Khan, multiple people
- Abdul Wahab Mahmoud (1909–1972), Iraqi politician
- Abdulwahab Al-Malood (born 1990), Bahraini footballer
- Abdul-Wahab Mirjan (1909–1964), Iraqi politician
- Abdul Wahab Mohammed Latif Al Mufti (died 1987), Iraqi politician
- Abdul Wahab Al-Nafisi (1933–2024), Kuwaiti politician
- Abdul Wahab Peevee (born 1950), Indian politician
- Abdul Wahhab Pirji (1890–1976), Bangladeshi Islamic scholar
- Abdul Wahab Raweh (born 1952), Yemeni politician
- Abdulwahab al-Rawhani (born 1958), Yemeni politician and diplomat
- Abdulwahab Al-Rushaid (born 1984), Kuwaiti economist and politician
- Abdul-Wahab al-Saadi (born 1963), Iraqi general
- Abdulwahab Al-Safi (born 1984), Bahraini footballer
- Abdul Wahab al-Shawaf (1916–1959), Iraqi military officer
- Abdul Wahab Siddiqi (1942–1994), Pakistani religious scholar and Sufi Master
- Abdul Wahab Wardak, Afghan army general
- Abdul Wahab Zahiri (born 1992), Afghan sprinter
- Mohamed Abdelwahab Abdelfattah (born 1962), Egyptian classical composer
- Mohammed ibn abd al-Wahab al-Ghassani (died 1707), Moroccan diplomat and travel writer
- Muhammad ibn Abd Al-Wahhab (1702–1792), Arab Hanbali scholar, founder of modern Wahhabism
- Qazi Abdul Wahhab (died 1675), chief justice of the Mughal Empire

== Surname ==
- A. T. M. Abdul Wahab (born 1946), Bangladeshi politician
- Afif Abdul Wahab (1915–2003), Lebanese doctor
- Ariffin Abdul Wahab, Bruneian military officer
- Bachir Abdelouahab (1897–1978), Algerian politician and medical doctor
- Fatin Abdel Wahab (1913–1972), Egyptian film director
- Khaled Abdul-Wahab (1911–1997), Tunisian who helped Jews in World War II
- Kheireddine Abdul Wahab (1878–1944), Lebanese businessman
- Mohamed Abdelwahab (1983–2006), Egyptian footballer
- Mohammed Abdel Wahab (1902–1991), Egyptian singer and composer
- Mounes Abdul Wahab (born 1947), Lebanese civil rights activist and author
- Muhammad Abdulwahhab (1923–2018), Indian Muslim religious teacher
- Musa Abed Al Wahab (born 1977), Saudi held in Guantanamo
- Qadi 'Abd al-Wahhab (973–1031), Iraqi Maliki scholar and jurist
- Shah Abdul Wahhab (1894–1982), Bangladeshi Islamic scholar
- Sherine Abdel Wahhab (born 1980), Egyptian singer
- Tuan Haji Anuar bin Haji Abd. Wahab (1945–2009), Malaysian silat expert
- Zamzani Abdul Wahab (Chef Zam) (born 1970), Malaysian chef

== See also ==
- Aboab family
