= Ahmad Yadgar =

Ahmad Yadgar was a Mughal-era author of the Tārikh-i-Salātin-i-Afghāniyah, a history of the Afghan monarchs of India. The History of India, as Told by Its Own Historians by Henry Miers Elliot and John Dowson provides a translation of the work. In his preface, Yadgar claims to be "an old servant of the Sur kings" and states that the work was commissioned by Daud Shah, the last Afghan ruler of Bengal. The book covers events from the time of Bahlul Lodi with the final chapter detailing the defeat and subsequent execution of Hemu at the Second Battle of Panipat.

Modern critical scholarship, however, considers his book to very likely be spurious. Yadgar's claims of having witnessed the dying days of the Sur Empire and of serving under Daud Shah have been rejected as fabricated. His book, was very likely composed to be sold by booksellers to gullible customers curious about the Afghans who had by then passed out of history. Much of its contents have been copied verbatim from works written during Akbar and Jahangir's reigns.
