= Yadgar-i-Bahaduri =

- Editor: Bahadur Singh
- Language: Persian
- Subject: geography, history, science, art
- Genre: non-fiction
- Published: 1834
- Publication place: Mughal Empire

Yadgar-i-Bahaduri (lit. 'The Memorial of Bahadur') is an Indian Persian language encyclopaedia of history, geography, science and art. Edited by Bahadur Singh, it was completed in 1834 CE in Lucknow.

== Authorship and date ==
Bahadur Singh was originally a resident of Gondiwal pargana in Shahjahanabad (otherwise known as Old Delhi). He was the son of Hazari Mal, who belonged to Bhatnagar clan of the Kayastha caste. He mentions that he was forced to leave Shahjahanbad due to circumstances, and arrived in Lucknow in 1817, under "great distress". At that time, Lucknow was ruled by Ghazi-ud-Din Haidar. At Lucknow, Bahadur Singh read several Hindi and Persian language works on history. He was inspired to write a connected history based on all these works. He finished the work on the first day of Ramazan in 1249 A.H. (12 January 1834 CE).

Bahadur Singh states that he has only copied content from other books, and organized it into an encyclopedia. But according to Charles Rieu he evidently added original content, especially on the later history of Awadh and Bengal. The detailed account of the Nawabs of Awadh, their families and their ministers is unique to this encyclopedia among other contemporary works.

For some reason, Bahadur Singh strongly resented Kashmiri people. In his book, Singh describes rape and murder of Kashmiri Hindus by Muslims over the centuries. He states that under Aurangzeb's rule, the total weight of sacred threads collected from Hindus forcibly converted to Islam was 10 seers. He further states that many of these later converted back to Hinduism. Singh's account does not aim to present Muslims as savages, rather to present Kashmiris as a group more degraded than mlecchas because of their illegitimacy. He urges other people to not only avoid Kashmiris, but destroy them. According to Christopher Bayly, as a lowly clerk, he was envious of the success of his Kashmiri rivals. Henry Miers Elliot suggests that he might have lost a job to a Kashmiri.

== Contents ==
The encyclopedia is divided into 4 books (Sanihah), which are further sub-divided into chapters (dastan).

=== Book I ===
Information on prophets from Adam to Muhammad.

=== Book II ===
1. The early Khalifas
2. The Twelve Imams
3. The Umayyads
4. The Abbasids
5. The Isma'ilis of Egypt and Kuhistan, and Qarmatians
6. The royal Sayyids
7. The Sharifs of Mecca and Medina

=== Book III ===
1. Philosophers of the world
  - Greece and Europe (including Columbus and Copernicus)
  - Persia and India
  - Others (early Muslims and modern physicians)
2. Companions of Muhammad
3. Their successors (Tabi‘un and Tubba')
4. Shaikhs of four types
  1. Sunnis
  2. Shias
  3. Sufis of Iran (mainly copied from Nafahat-ul-Uns)
  4. Hindu theosophists, devotees and their sects
5. Ulama
6. Poets and miscellaneous
  - Arab poets
  - Persian poets
  - Different kinds of handwriting
  - Rekhta poets of India
  - Rules of versification (metre, rhyme, and poetical figures)
  - Physiognomy
  - Interpretation of dreams
  - Breath regulation as practised by Hindus
  - Astrology and astrologers
  - Music of Hindustan
  - Agriculture ("the best of all the arts")
  - Architecture / Masonry
  - Ironmongery
  - Carpentry
  - Commerce
  - Painting
  - Talismans
  - Magic
  - Handicrafts of various descriptions, including cookery
  - Wise sayings, witticisms and anecdotes
7. Celebrated Muslims not included in earlier sections

=== Book IV ===
This book begins with an introduction (mukaddimah) of the Old World and the New World.

- The seven climes
- Countries and cities of the world:
  - Muslim world
  - Europe
  - India, including separate accounts of the Mughal subahs (provinces)
    - Agra
    - Awadh
    - Daultabad
    - Khandesh
    - Berar
    - Malwa
    - Ajmer
    - Gujarat
    - Thatta
    - Multan
    - Kabul
    - Kandahar
    - Kashmir
    - Allahabad
    - Bengal
    - Orissa
Islands of the world (including England)
Americas

The introduction is followed by 8 chapters (fasls):

1. Kings of Iran
  - Early kings
  - Kings of Sistan
  - Saffaris
  - Kings of Tabistan
  - Tahiris
  - Dailamis
  - Ghaznavis
  - Seljuqs of Iran and Kirman
  - Atabaks of Azarbaijan, Pars, and Luristan
  - Ghuris
  - Qara Khitais of Kirman
  - Ilkhanis
  - Kurts
  - Sarbadars
  - Injus
  - Muzaffaris
  - Timur and his successors
  - Rulers of Shirvan and Dagestan
  - Zulkadr
  - Kara Koyunlus and Ag Qoyunlus
  - Safavis
  - Ghilzais
  - Afshars (Nader Shah to Karim Khan)
  - Abdalis (till Kamran Shah)
  - Zands and Kajars (till Fath-Ali Shah)
2. Kings of the Arabs
  - Adites
  - Kings of Babylon and Assyria
  - Himyaris and Ghassanis
  - Abyssinians
  - Karmatites
  - Ayyubis of Yemen
  - Hamdanis
3. Greek and Romans [sic]
  - Seljuks of Rum
  - Osmanlis
4. Rulers of Egypt and Sham (Syria)
  - Pharaohs and kings of Israel
  - Ikhshidis
  - Seljuks and Atabaks of Syria
  - Ayyubis and Mamluks
5. Maghreb
  - Seventeen dynasties, from the Umayyads of Spain to the Sharifs of Pez
6. Sultans of Turkistan
  - Early kings
  - Chingiz Khan
  - Descendants of Juji
  - Descendants of Chagatai
  - Ilkhanis, and Chupanis
  - Tughatimuris
  - Samanis
  - Khans of Turkistan, Bughra Khan and others
  - Khwarazmians
  - Timur and his successors
  - Uzbeks in Turan, Khwarezm, and Badakhshan
7. Kings of Europe
  - Creeds, manners, and institutions of the Europeans
  - including the British in India, their army, administration of justice, revenue, learning
8. Rulers of Hindustan: its different provinces and inhabitants
  - Hindu castes, laws, ceremonies, manners, and mythology (avatars)
  - Early Rajas
  - Rajputs
  - Muslim conquest
  - Slaves of the Ghuris
  - Khaljis
  - Tughlukshahis
  - Khizirkhanis
  - Lodis
  - Surs
  - Timurids, from Babar to the accession of Akbar II
  - Malwa
  - Deccan
  - Khandesh
  - Samaris of Malivar (Malabar)
  - Hurmuz
  - Mysore
  - Bijanagar
  - Marathas
  - Nizams of Hyderabad
  - Gujarat
  - Ajmer, Rajputs, and Jats
  - Thatta
  - Lahore
  - Kashmir
  - Tibet
  - Kabul
  - Bengal
  - Benares
  - Jaunpur
  - Early rulers of Awadh, including Rama
  - Nawabs of Awadh from Saadat Ali Khan to the time of composition
  - Rules of conduct and useful advice to kings and vazirs

== Translations ==
Munshi Sadasukh Lal partially translated Yadgar-i-Bahaduri into English. This translation appears in Henry Miers Elliot's History of India.
