= Abdul Wahab (Mughal historian) =

17th century Mughal historian

- Died: 1622–3
- Era: Medieval India
- Employer: Mughal Empire
- Known for: Mughal Historian
- Notable work: Intikhab-I-Jahangir Shahi

Abdul Wahab also known as Shaikh Abdul Wahab, (died 1622/3) was a Mughal historian and close companion of Mughal Emperor Jahangir. He is known for his work, the Intikhab-I-Jahangir Shahi.

== Works ==
Abdul Wahab created the Intikhab-I-Jahangir Shahi, a work that covered information on the reign of Mughal Emperor Jahangir. The information on the reign of Jahangir is described as valuable by Gommens. However, the Intikhab-I-Jahangir Shahi is no longer available, but it has had some work extracted by Henry Miers Elliot in his The History of India, as Told by Its Own Historians.

The work itself has been cited across numerous books, with Mehta describing it "intelligent", providing key insight into Jahangir's life. It details public charity acts, and punishments conducted on Khusrau Mirza. The work also provides key detail into the rebellion of Mahabat Khan.

Many modern secondary sources cite it as a part of selected bibliography due to its reliable contemporary accounts.

== Death ==
Abdul Wahab died sometime in 1622 or 1623.
