= Moune =

Moune or Mounes may refer to:

- Mounes Abdul Wahab (born 1947), Lebanese disability rights activist
- Mounes-Prohencoux, commune in France
- Ti Moune, a major character in the Broadway musical Once on This Island
