= Ghassani =

Ghassani may refer to

- the Ghassanids
- or people with the given name Ghassan

or to

- Abul Qasim ibn Mohammed al-Ghassani
- Mohammed ibn abd al-Wahab al-Ghassani
