= John Beames =

English civil servant (1837–1902)

John William Beames
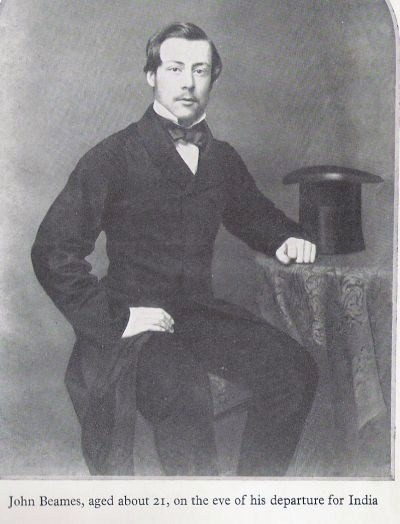
- Born: 21 June 1837; Greenwich, United Kingdom
- Died: 24 May 1902 (aged 64)
- Occupations: Civil servant, author
- Parent: Rev. Thomas Beames

John William Beames (21 June 1837 – 24 May 1902) was a civil servant and author in British India. He served in the Punjab from March 1859 to late 1861, and in Bengal from December 1861 until the conclusion of his service in 1893. He was also a scholar of Indian history, literature and linguistics. His great work was a comparative grammar of Indo-Aryan languages, published in three volumes in 1872–1879. When he retired from the Indian Civil Service in March 1893, he had gained extensive knowledge of Indian life, and in 1896 wrote an account of his career, first published in 1961 as Memoirs of a Bengal Civilian.

== Early life ==
Beames was born in the Royal Naval Hospital, Greenwich, a few hours after the death of William IV and the consequent ascent of Queen Victoria to the English throne. He was the eldest son of Rev. Thomas Beames, preacher of St James's Church, Piccadilly and grandson of John Beames Esq., a barrister and later bencher of Lincoln's Inn, and spent his formative years moving around England with his father's appointment to various parishes before being sent for education at Merchant Taylors' School in 1847 and Haileybury College in 1856. In his fourth term at Haileybury, Beames won the College's Classic, and Sanskrit prizes as well as the Persian Medal. This affinity with languages served him well in India and permitted him to excel in his early examinations in Calcutta.

== India ==
Beames arrived in India in 1858 to work in the Indian Civil Service (ICS), serving in the Punjab from March 1859 to late 1861. From December 1861, he was employed in the Bengal Presidency, becoming a permanent Collector in 1867 and a Commissioner in 1881. He thrice officiated as a Member of the Board of Revenue. He was a District Officer and Collector of several districts in Bengal, and the Commissioner of Chittagong until he retired in 1893. In his autobiography, which was not published until 1961, he describes himself as "an obscure person – an average, ordinary, middle-class Englishman".

== Career and scholarly contribution ==
Beames's scholarly contributions began early in his career. While at the district of Champaran, Bihar, he published essays in the Bengal Asiatic Society. These dealt with the question of retaining Arabic element in the official form of Hindustani. Treating Bishop Caldwell's Comparative Grammar of the Dravidian Languages as a model, he commenced work on the counterpart of Aryan languages. To the Journal of the Bengal Asiatic Society, Beames contributed essays on Chand Bardoi and other old Hindi authors and studies on the antiquities and history of Odisha (1870–1883). In 1891, he published a pioneering volume Bengali Grammar, and after his retirement, he wrote for the Imperial and Asiatic Quarterly Review. He is best known for his Comparative Grammar of the Aryan Languages of India, published in separate volumes in 1872, 1895 and 1879.

As Collector of Balasore and Cuttack, Beames developed his local linguistic and cultural work in Comparative Grammar of the Aryan Languages of India and his essays in Indian Antiquary and Journal of the Bengal Asiatic Society. He made notable interventions for the survival of the Odia language, contributing to regional formations in Eastern India.

== Role in the survival of the Odia language ==
The Odia – Bengali language conflict started with language hegemony, that was deployed by sections of the Bengali colonial administration for the exercise of power by cornering government jobs. One of the earlier manifestations by resistance to the colonial administration in Odisha was the assertion of linguistic and cultural identity. .

In 1867, for instance, Deputy Magistrate Rangalal Bandhopadhyaya spoke in public meeting of the primacy of Bengali over Odia. Likewise, well-known Bengali scholar Rajendralal Mitra who came to study the temples of Cuttack declared that there was no need to have a separate language for a mere 2 million Odia population. In fact, Mitra argued that Odisha was doomed to remain backward so long as it had a separate language. Pandit Kanti Chandra Bhattacharya, a teacher of Balasore Zilla School, published a little pamphlet named "Udiya Ekti Swatantray Bhasha Noi" (Odia not an independent language) where Mr. Bhattacharya claimed that Odia was not a separate and original form of language and was a mere corruption of Bengali. He suggested the British Government abolish all Odia Vernacular Schools from Odisha and convert them into Bengali Vernacular Schools. Beames examined both the languages from close quarters and suggests that as a separate language “Uriya extends along the sea coast from Subarnarekha to near Ganjam.’ Landwards, its boundary is uncertain, it melts gradually into the Boud (Boudh) and other rude hill dialects and co-exists with them." Beames wrote three notes that remain supremely important in this regard. 'On the relation of the Odia to the other modern Aryan language,' ‘On Odia language, script and literature' and 'Urya.' These refuted the claim that Odia was a dialect of Bengali, specifically the conspiracy of Bengali intellectuals to abolish Odia Language got dimmed by Beames's exposition of the origin of Odia language and his study of its evolution brought him closer to the Odia people who were battling then for the survival of their language.

John Beames cultural legacy lies in the comparative study of languages. His support of the cause of Odia was timely and contributed vitally to community formation in Odisha during the 19th century. Beames, who stayed for a considerable time in Odisha and worked for the survival of Odia language, said on the topic:

[T]here exists in the present day an active controversy between the literary heads of [Bengal and Orissa]. The Bengalis assert that Oriya is merely a dialect of Bengali, and has no claim to be considered an independent language, and they mix up this assertion with a second to the effect that if it is not, it ought to be, mainly because they wish it was, and secondarily because the population of Orissa is so small as compared with that of Bengal that they think it useless to keep up a separate language and written character for so small a province.

If Oriya is to be suppressed because it is only spoken by a few millions of people, it might also be urged that Dutch, or Danish, or Portuguese, should be obliterated also. Basque should also be stamped out, and the same argument would apply to Romaic or Modern Greek, and would justify the Russians in trying to eradicate Polish, or the Austrians in annihilating Czech.

Moreover, it is far beyond the power of the handful of English and Bengalis to stamp out the mother-tongue of all these millions, and it may be added that any forcible measures of repression would be entirely foreign and repugnant to the spirit of our policy.

The result of teaching Bengali in our schools, to the exclusion of the local vernacular, would only be that the small proportion of Oriya boys who attend those schools would know the former in addition to the latter, that they would learn to despise their mother-tongue, and that a gap would be created between the mass of the peasantry and the small body of educated persons.

== Beames and Odisha ==
Beames' Memoirs records his stay in Odisha as a period of great happiness and productivity. Odisha had just recovered from a severe famine in 1866 when he arrived in Balasore in 1869. He learnt Odia and wrote on its language, literature, temple iconography, fortresses and folklore. He identified with local sentiments for the preservation and promotion of the Odia language. In "On a Copper Plate Grant from Balasore AD 1483", he argued that Odia script had developed from a southern variety of Kutila type. He wrote on the poetry of DinaKhrushna Das and pioneered comparative folk culture studies with the publication of his folklore of Odisha.

== Views ==
John Beames was not known for his progressive views. A staunch representative of reactionary Anglo-Indian opinion, he sincerely believed that Indian officers, who formed a minuscule minority in the ICS, should not be given salaries on par with the salaries given to British officials in the same service. This he clearly stated in a deposition to the Aitchison Committee which looked into the possibility of equalising the salaries of all officials, British and Indian, in the ICS at the time of the Ilbert Bill controversy in 1883.

Beames was a die-hard conservative who allowed his personal preferences to colour his professional judgements and interactions with his Indian juniors in the ICS. For example, while deposing before the Aitchison Committee, he insisted that one of his junior Indian colleagues in the ICS, Brajendranath De, esq., then serving in Hooghly under the (Acting) Commissionership of Beames, should be told not to sit in the presence of his and other British members of the committee. Beames' demand was not met by the committee members. He was asked to leave the room while De, fully seated, was extensively questioned by the committee members. Later De's views were heeded in the committee's report.

== Later life ==
Beames retired to Clevedon, Somerset, where he died on 24 May 1902.

== See also ==
- Odisha
- Odia language
- Odia Literature
- Rebati
- John Beames's Essays on Orissa History and Literature : Edited by Kailash Patnaik, Published by Prafulla Pathagara, Jagatsinghpur, Cuttack, 2004

== Bibliography ==
- B. P. Ambashthya, editor, Beames' contributions to the political geography of the subahs of Awadh, Bihar, Bengal, and Orissa in the age of Akbar. Patna: Janaki Prakashan, 1976.
- John Beames, A comparative grammar of the modern Aryan languages of India : to wit, Hindi, Panjabi, Sindhi, Gujarati, Marathi, Oriya, and Bangali. London: Trübner, 1872–1879. 3 vols.
- John Beames, Memoirs of a Bengal Civilian. London: Chatto & Windus, 1961. Reprinted 1984 and 2013 by Eland. ISBN 978-090787109-5
- Henry Miers Elliot, Memoirs on the History, Folk-lore and Distribution of the Races of the North Western Provinces of India: Being an Amplified Edition of the Original Supplemental Glossary of Indian Terms, 2 vols. revised by John Beames. London: Trübner, 1869; New Delhi, Asian Educational Services, 2 vols. (2004) ISBN 81-206-1905-6
- John Beames's Essays on Orissa History and Literature : Edited by Kailash Patnaik, Published by Prafulla Pathagara, Jagatsinghpur, Cuttack, 2004
- John Beames, Grammar of the Bengali Language: Literary and Colloquial. London: Trübner, 1891.
- John Beames, Outlines of Indian Philology: With a Map Shewing the Distribution of Indian Languages. London: Trübner, 1868. (Multiple later reprint editions exist.)
- John Beames, "Chaitanya and the Vaishnava Poets of Bengal." Reprinted in later editions as a standalone volume, 2004
