= Mounes Abdul Wahab =

Lebanese civil rights activist

- Born: 1947 (age 78–79); El-Mina, Lebanon
- Education: American University of Beirut
- Occupations: Activist, author

Mounes Abdul Wahab (born 1947) is a civil rights activist, author and pioneer of disability rights movement in Lebanon. He has been blind since birth.

== Early life ==
Mounes was born to Fadwa and Kifli Abdul Wahab in the Lebanese city of El-Mina, and is a grandson of Kheireddine Abdul Wahab. Blind at birth, Mounes spent his early years in El Mina, mostly home schooled. Later during his teens, he was schooled in specialized schools in Beirut and Cairo, Egypt, where he learned braille. He then enrolled at the American University of Beirut, where he received a bachelor's degree in Arabic literature in 1974 and later a master's degree in the same subject in 1983.

== Civil Rights Activism ==
Abdul Wahab's civil activism began while he was still a student at the American University of Beirut. He joined the Lebanese Association of Blind Workers (established in 1935) and was elected to its board of governors in 1974. While still a student at the university, in 1975, he founded the Lebanese Association of Blind University Graduates and represented Lebanon in the international conference for the blind in Berlin, Germany that same year, which saw participation of over 130 countries.

With Lebanese Civil War breaking out in 1975, Abdul Wahab was forced to suspend his graduate studies and return to his hometown of El-Mina. He later resumed his graduate studies in 1981, and continued his activism by hosting a radio show With the Handicapped for three years that helped raise awareness of issues faced by the disability community and bring them to the general public. That same year, he was appointed to the National Committee of the Disabled, and represented Lebanon in regional conferences for the disabled between 1981 and 1984 in Amman, Sharja and Riyadh respectively.

Upon his graduation with an MA in Arabic Literature in 1983, he returned to his hometown of El-Mina in North Lebanon, and was, alongside professor Nawaf Kabbara, a founding member of the North Lebanon branch of The Friends of the Handicapped Association, the largest non-governmental organization for people with disabilities in Lebanon. With Kabbara, he played a vital role in pioneering events such as the Handicapped Peacewalk from North to South Lebanon in 1987 and the 1988 Oxfam Lebanon Peace conference which formed a significant step in the disability rights movement in the country. Abdul Wahab again represented his country in numerous conferences in Belarus, Egypt and Jordan.

Abdul Wahab remains active on the civil rights scene and was the first disabled man to be elected to municipal committee of El-Mina in the 1996 general elections.

He published his memoirs in 2003 and remains a regular contributor to numerous publications and newspapers.
