= Wahhab =

Name of God in Islam

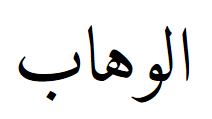
Al-Wahhab

Wahhab (Arabic: وَهَّابُ, romanized: Wahhāb) is an Arabic word meaning "Bestower", from the root W-H-B. Al-Wahhab (Arabic: ٱلْوَهَّابُ, romanized: al-Wahhāb), meaning "The Bestower" is one of the attributes of God in Islam. It is also used as a personal name, as a short form of Abd al-Wahhab (servant of the Bestower).

== In the Qur'an ==
- Appears three times in the Qur'an:

Chapter (surah) and Verse (ayah)	Original text	Translation "Sahih International"
Al Imran: 8	رَبَّنَا لَا تُزِغْ قُلُوبَنَا بَعْدَ إِذْ هَدَيْتَنَا وَهَبْ لَنَا مِنْ لَدُنْكَ رَحْمَةً ۚ إِنَّكَ أَنْتَ الْوَهَّابُ	"Our Lord, let not our hearts deviate after You have guided us and grant us from Yourself mercy. Indeed, You are the Bestower.
Sad: 9	أَمْ عِنْدَهُمْ خَزَائِنُ رَحْمَةِ رَبِّكَ الْعَزِيزِ الْوَهَّابِ	Or do they have the depositories of the mercy of your Lord, the Exalted in Might, the Bestower?
Sad: 35	قَالَ رَبِّ اغْفِرْ لِي وَهَبْ لِي مُلْكًا لَا يَنْبَغِي لِأَحَدٍ مِنْ بَعْدِي ۖ إِنَّكَ أَنْتَ الْوَهَّابُ	He said, "My Lord, forgive me and grant me a kingdom such as will not belong to anyone after me. Indeed, You are the Bestower."

== See also ==
- Abdul Wahhab
- Wahhabism
