= Zekra Alwach =

Iraqi politician

Zekra Muhammed
- ذكرى محمد جابر علوش

Mayor of Baghdad
- In office 22 February 2015 – 20 September 2020
- Preceded by: Naim Aboub al-Kaabi
- Succeeded by: Manhal Al Habbobi

Personal details
- Education: University of Baghdad

Thikra or Zekra Muhammed Jaber Alwash (Arabic: ذكرى محمد جابر علوش) was the mayor of Baghdad from February 2015 until September 2020, superseding Naim Aboub al-Kaabi, and preceding Manhal Al Habbobi. Alwach has a Bachelor in engineering from Baghdad University of Technology, a Master in construction project management from University of Baghdad and a PhD in construction project management from Baghdad University of Technology. She started her career in 1993 as an engineer in construction projects and was responsible for administrative responsibilities until she was appointed director general of the Ministry of Higher Education, and is regarded as highly skilled technocrat. Alwach reported directly to the former Prime Minister, Haider al-Abadi. In her only interview with an English-language publication Alwach talked about the challenges of governing a war-torn city, the weight of responsibility she feels to succeed and the struggle for women’s rights in Iraq. She was married to Major General Ali Araji.

== See also ==
- Baghdad City
- List of mayors of Baghdad
