= Youssef Hamadeh =

Lebanese footballer (born 1994)

Personal information
- Full name: Youssef Mahmoud Hamadeh
- Date of birth: 10 August 1994 (age 32)
- Place of birth: El Mina, Lebanon
- Height: 1.80 m (5 ft 11 in)
- Position: Midfielder

Senior career*
Years	Team	Apps	(Gls)
2013–2016	Tripoli	20	(0)
2016–2017	Egtmaaey Tripoli	9	(1)
2020–2022	Shabab Tripoli		
2022–2023	Shabab Deir Aamar		
2023–	Homenetmen		

International career
2015	Lebanon U23	1	(0)
2014	Lebanon	3	(0)
- * Club domestic league appearances and goals

Youssef Mahmoud Hamadeh (Arabic: يوسف محمود حمادة; born 10 August 1994) is a Lebanese footballer who plays as a midfielder for Lebanese Fourth Division team Homenetmen.

== International career ==
Hamadeh played for Lebanon in three friendly games in 2014, against Qatar, Saudi Arabia, and the United Arab Emirates.

== Honours ==
Tripoli

- Lebanese FA Cup: 2014–15; runner-up: 2013–14
