= Port of Tripoli (Lebanon) =

- Port of Tripoli Logo

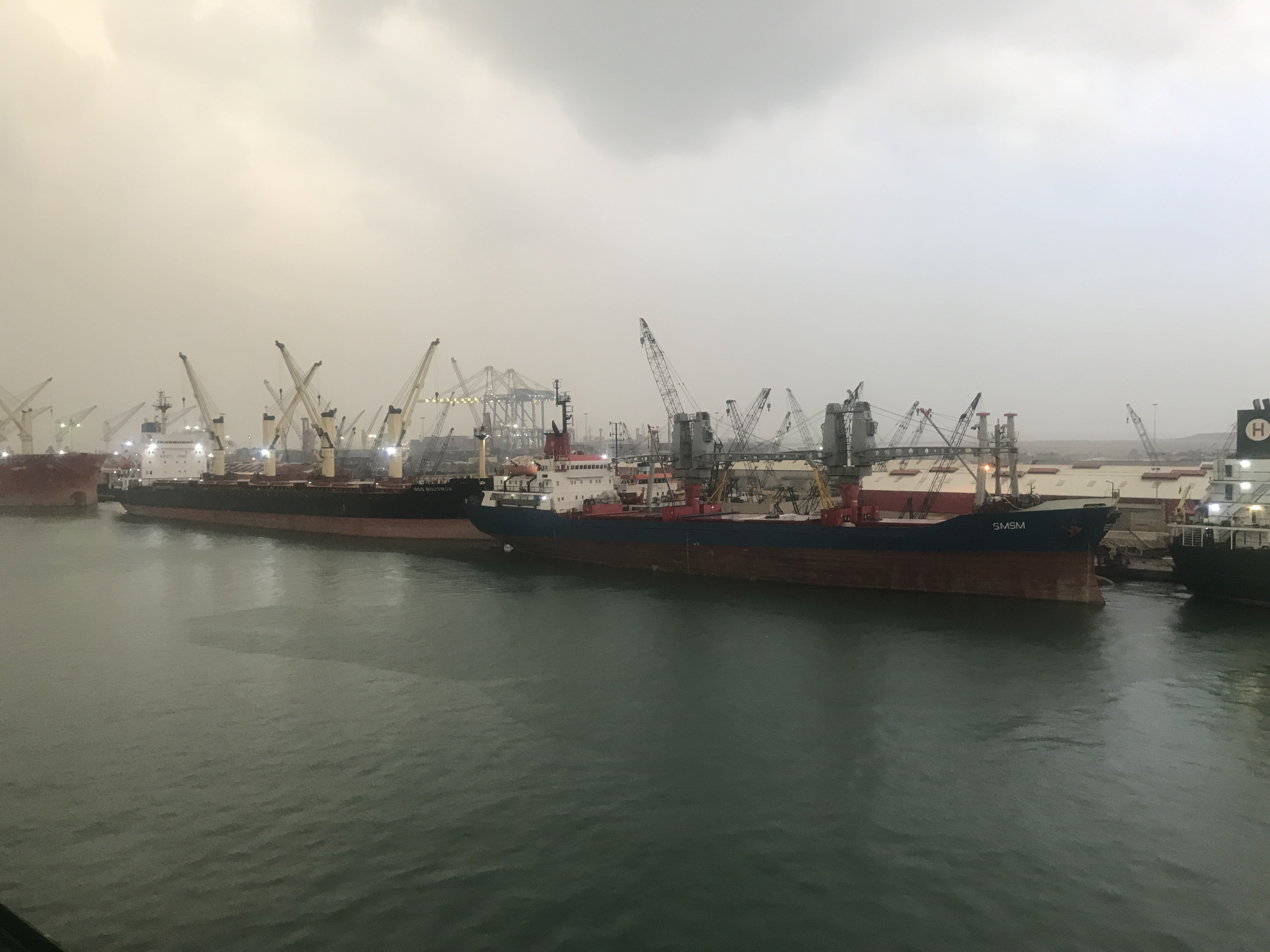
- Interactive map of Port of Tripoli

Location
- Country: Lebanon
- Location: Tripoli
- Coordinates: 34°27′03″N 35°49′43″E
- UN/LOCODE: LBKYE

Details
- Opened: 1959
- Operated by: Tripoli Port Authority
- Owned by: Government of Lebanon
- Type of Harbor: Artificial/Coastal breakwater
- Size of harbour: 2,200,000 m²
- Size: 3,000,000 m²
- No. of berths: 8
- No. of wharfs: 1
- Port Manager: Ahmad Tamer

Statistics
- Vessel arrivals: 450 ships (yearly)
- Website

The Port of Tripoli (Arabic: مرفأ طرابلس) is the second major port in Lebanon. The port covers an approximate area of 3 square kilometres (1.2 sq mi), with a water area of 2.2 square kilometres (0.85 sq mi), and the land area composing of 320,000 square metres (3,400,000 sq ft), and a 420,000 square metres (4,500,000 sq ft) dump area adjacent to the current port, reserved for the future Container Terminal and Free Market Zone.

== History ==
The port of Tripoli remained by and large a natural harbor, a geographical strip of land where sailboats servicing the trade lines along the coastlines of Turkey, Syria, Lebanon and Egypt, extending to Malta, Crete and Greece would dock. The crescent-shaped gulf of El Mina acted as natural shelter to North East winds that create strong currents in deep waters.

Ships docked in the El Mina gulf and were serviced by local merchant boats that offloaded the ship cargo by manual labor to the small boats that transferred the goods to the dry docks. Up to the early twentieth century, ships typically carried small to medium loads of 50 to 75 tons per ship.

The first significant development came during the French Mandate for Syria and the Lebanon when two dry docks, Gremblad and Sheikh Afan, were constructed to allow military tugboats to dock. A third and rarely used natural harbor on the east side of the city acted as backup when the North East winds were exceptionally strong. However, the rocky nature of that area was a last resort and required the best of the local seamen's expertise, sometimes assisted by El Mina fisherman who knew the waters well.

At the dawn of the Second World War, French fighter and supply planes coming from the Far East (India, China and Vietnam) used the El Mina basin as a landing area. The local current within the basin caused problems and then El Mina Mayor Kheireddine Abdul Wahab was given the contract to construct the first man made breakwater which marked the beginning of the Port of Tripoli.

Sailboats built mainly on the island of Arwad in Syria and later also in El Mina sharply declined with the rise of steamships, and the city saw increased activity as an offloading site for merchant ships and with service industries emerging, such as the use of transport barges which were used to offload the ships' cargo from its anchored position to the sea shores. The French Mandate continued its development of the port by constructing a small docking station within the man-made pond resulting from the break water constructed and now buzzing with barges. The barges' docking allowed for faster and more efficient offloading of cargo, which was then transported to the railway station and on to the wagons into inland Syria, Iraq and Jordan. This also coincided with the Iraq Petroleum Company (IPC) pipeline project to import steel and iron for its refinery construction project in the neighbouring Lebanese town of Beddawi.

During the late 1950s, the government of Lebanese President Camille Chamoun and Prime Minister Rashid Karami awarded a contract to the Italian company Veining to construct a modern harbor. Due to intense lobbying from Port of Beirut patrons, the depth of the inner harbor pond was restricted to 8 meters, which would later hinder the Tripoli harbor from receiving larger vessels. With work beginning in 1957, the first board of directors was appointed in 1961 to oversee the daily operations of the harbor, now a government entity.

== Governance ==
The port is governed by the Port of Tripoli Governing Board, which is a 5-member Board of Directors, appointed by the Lebanese Ministry of Transport composed of local businessmen and dignitaries best suited to oversee the operation of the harbor. The Port of Tripoli is independent both administratively and financially, and is governed by the General Code for Public Institutions according to Lebanese Government decree number 4513.

The first committee was appointed in 1961 to a renewable term of 3-years. With the breakout of the civil war in 1976, the same members continued to serve until 1991, when the first post-war Board was appointed and began planning the new Tripoli Harbor on the north side of the existing reef. The contract was awarded to a China Harbor Ltd. a Chinese port development company, to develop a new dock 1800 meters of length and a basin of 15 meters depth, with the first 600 meters complete by October 2011.

== Port details ==
Type	Depth
Anchorage	17.1–18.2 m
Cargo pier	13m and 11m
Oil terminal depth	17.1–18.2 m
Dry dock	N/A
Harbor size	Medium
Railway Size	N/A
Harbor Type	Coastal Breakwater
Repairs	Moderate
Shelter	Good

== Services and Facilities ==
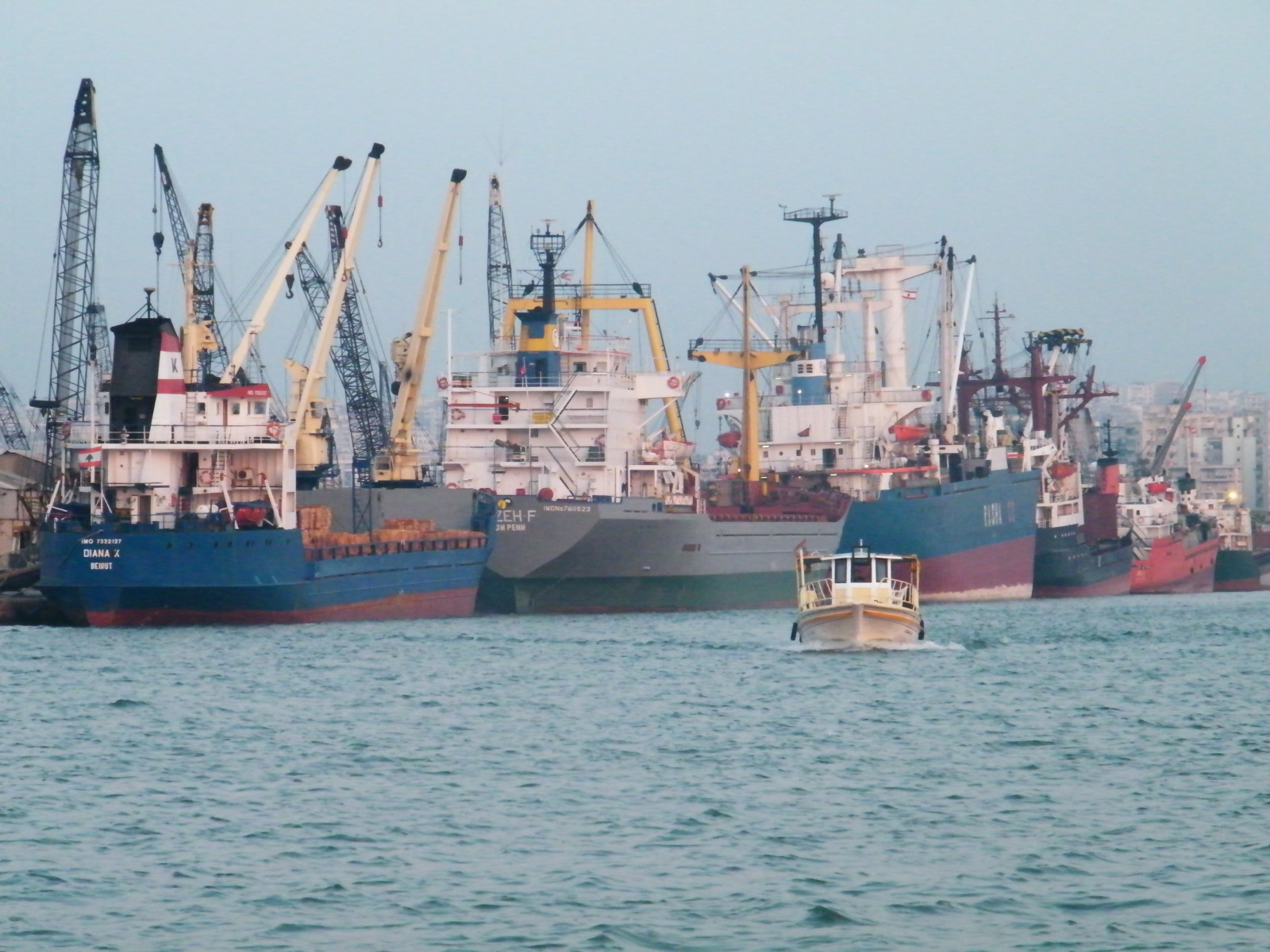
Ships docking on one of the port's quays

Warehouses & Yards

- 4 Warehouses for dry drainage goods, with an area of 11,000 m²
- 10 Warehouses for dry drainage goods and Wood, with an area of 17,500 m²
- 5 Yards to store vehicles, with an area exceeding 10,000 m²
- 1 Yard to store Containers, with an area of 10,000 m²
- 1 Yard for general purpose, with an area of 15,000 m²
- 2 Yards with an area of 3,000 m² to store fir wood

Port Equipment

- 6 Mobile cranes with capacity of 125–165 tons
- 7 Mobile cranes with capacity of 100–120 tons
- 10 Mobile cranes with capacity of 70–90 tons
- 20 Mobile cranes with capacity of 40–65 tons
- 11 Mobile cranes with capacity of 25–38 tons
- 15 gafs for drainage goods
- 24 Forklifts
- 8 Bulldozers
- 30 Trucks
- 4 Tractors
- Equipment for stowage of dry drainage goods

Water Supply

- 8 outlets to supply ships with water using modern technologies
- A shalon with a reservoir to supply ships with water inside and outside the basins (this service is provided by the guidance station)

Other Services

- 3 Cafeterias to serve the Administration building and the Berths
- A Hospital (under construction)
- An office for the Workers' Union

== Future ==
As of the early 2010s', plans to develop the Port of Tripoli have been announced by the Ministry of Transport, to expand the Port of Tripoli by 1.2 square kilometres (0.46 sq mi) and to construct refrigerated warehouses, buildings for light and assembly industries, and big sized warehouses. The plan also aims at enlarging the quay length up to 2,200 metres (7,200 ft) and its draft up to 12 metres (39 ft) of depth. The Tripoli Port Authority has prepared a master plan in alliance with the French Company, Sogreah, to enlarge and rehabilitate the Tripoli port and its free zone.

== See also ==
- El Mina, Lebanon
