= List of mayors of Baghdad =

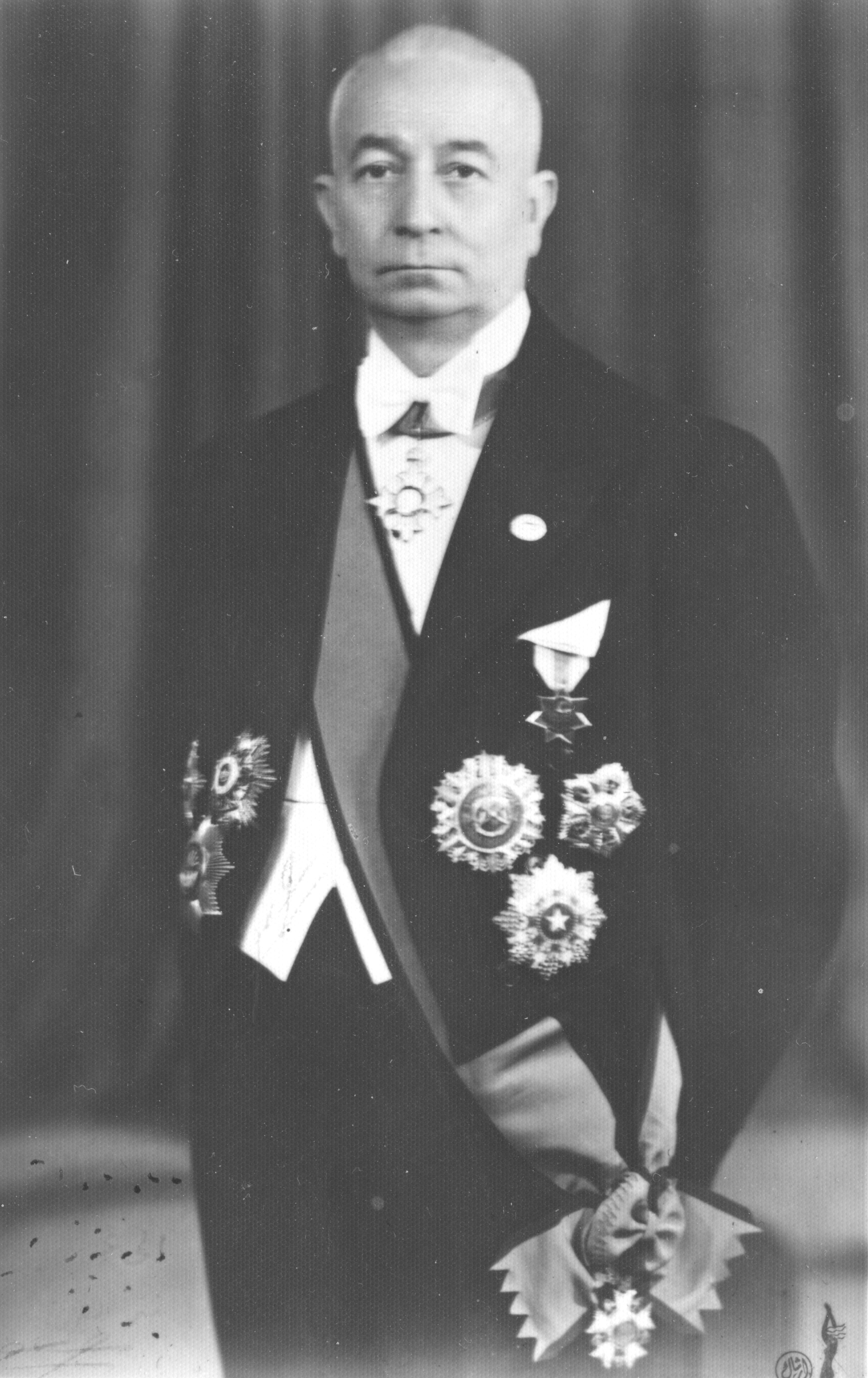
Arshad al-Umari

== List of mayors ==
Person	Time as mayor
Rashid al-Khoja	1924–1925
Mahmud Subhi al-Daftary	1930–1931
Arshad al-Umari	1931–1933
Mahmud Subhi al-Daftary	1933–1936
Arshad al-Umari	1936–1944
Hussam aldin Jumea	1944–1946
Fayek Shakir	1946–1948
Abdulhadi al-Bajaji	1948–1949
Mudaffar Ahmed	1949–1951
Abdullah Qassab	1951–1953
Fakhri al-Tabaqchali	1953–1954
Fakhri al-Fakhri	1954–1958
Unknown	1958–c. 2015
Khairallah Talfah	1979–1981
Abdul Wahab Mohammed Latif Al Mufti	1981–1987
Naim Aboub al-Kaabi	–2015
Zekra Alwach	2015–2020
Manhal Al Habbobi	2020–2020
Alaa Al-Amari	2020–2022
Ammar Moussa Kadhim	2022–present
