= El Mina, Lebanon =

City in Lebanon

El-Mina الميناء
- City of Waves and Horizon
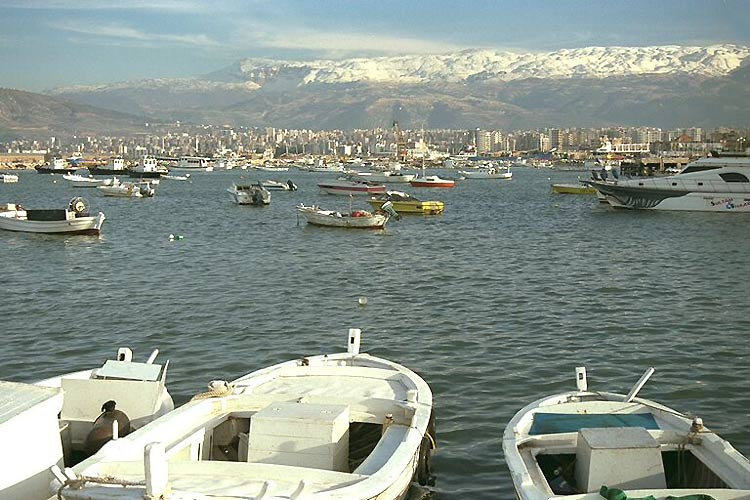

- Seal
- Interactive map of El-Mina
- Location within Lebanon
- Coordinates: 34°26.82′N 35°49.07′E
- Country: Lebanon
- Governorate: North Governorate
- District: Tripoli District

Population
  - Total: 150,000
- Time zone: UTC+2 (EET)
  - Summer (DST): UTC+3 (EEST)
- Dialing code: +961-6
- Website: https://elminacity.org/

El-Mina or El Mina (Arabic: الميناء / ALA-LC: al-Mīnā’, which means 'the harbour'), is the coastal side and harbor of Tripoli, Northern Lebanon. El-Mina occupies the coastal location of the old Phoenician city of Tripolis. It is Lebanon's second-largest city, situated 5 km to the east.

El-Mina has a municipality on its own, for few decades now. The commercial Port of Tripoli falls within El Mina jurisdiction, but is operated jointly by the municipalities of El-Mina and Tripoli.

== History ==
El-Mina is the harbor of the ancient city of Tripolis that dates back to the Phoenician era. From that period, El-Mina was the commercial and fishing port of Tripoli, eventually having its own municipal board in the beginning of the 20th century, but within the context of greater Tripoli. It was called also Tripoli Marina.

The coast of El Mina is also where the Sinking of HMS Victoria occurred on 22nd June 1883, leading to the drowning of 350 British naval seamen.The vessel rest vertically on the sea bed and is a protected wreck site by the Lebanese Coast Guard.

== Geography ==
El-Mina is the city with the largest number of islands surrounding it, along the Levantine coastline. It has nine islands, the closest, the Abdul Wahab Island, can be visited by crossing a bridge over the sea. The farthest island, Ramkin, is 10 km away from the coast, and has a lighthouse. Four of the islands have been declared as natural reservations, to help breed fish, and preserve their natural habitat. The city's seashore extends 3 to 4 k. The city is mostly flat, and has a diameter of only 1 km, that extends from the seashore to the border of the city of Tripoli. Due to large expansion, El-Mina and Tripoli are almost attached.

=== Islands ===
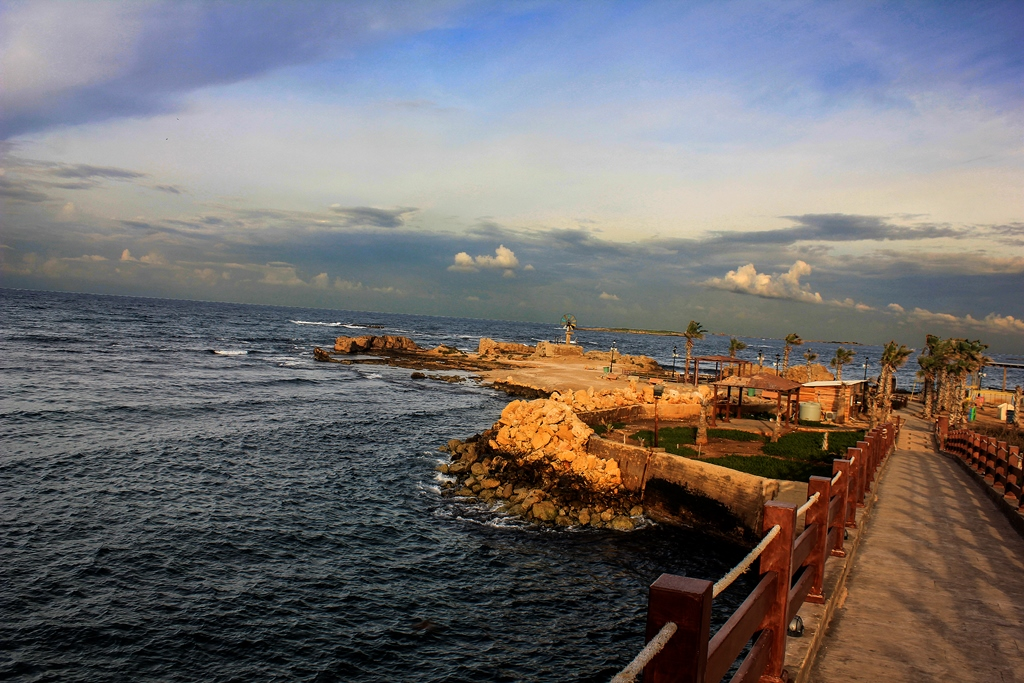
Abdul Wahab Island with bridge

- Al-Bakkar ("the cowman") island: Commonly known as Abdul Wahab Island, it is the closest island to the coastline, and can be reached by crossing a bridge.
- Al-Nakhl ("the palm trees") Island or commonly known as Al-Aranib ("The Rabbits") Island is the largest island and is declared Palm Islands Nature Reserve.
- Al-Billan (named after a type of plant that grows on it) contains a small cavern on the west side.
- Al-Ramkin also known as Al-Fanar: El-Mina's farthest island, and has a lighthouse. The island was frequented by slain Prime Minister Rashid Karami.
- Sanani is also a natural reserve where sea turtles lay their eggs.
- Al-Rmayleh is one of the smaller islands.
- Al-`Ashaak ("the lovers") is also known as El-Tenieh ("the second").
- Al-Telteh ("the third") is a flat, rocky island midway between the coastline and the farthest island, Al-Ramkin.
- Al-Rab`aa ("the fourth"), also known as Al-Maatih ("the cut-off"), is the smallest island and is used as a docking place by fishermen while out at sea.

== City Parks ==
- Mashti (The Winter) is close to the seaside where the old port of the city used to be.
- Shouhada (Martyrs) was constructed in 1964.
- Baher (Fabulous) contains more than 500 types of trees.
- El-Bi'a (The Environment) contains some remains, palm trees, and flowering shrubs.

== Demographics ==
Religion in El Mina (2014)
| Religion | Percent |
| Sunni Islam | 72.60% |
| Shia Islam | 0.55% |
| Alawites | 0.53% |
| Christian | 25.71% |
| Others | 0.61% |

In 2014 Muslims made up 73.68% and Christians made up 25.71% of registered voters in El Mina. 72.60% of the voters were Sunni Muslims and 15.78% were Greek Orthodox.

== City towers ==
El-Mina traditionally was a walled city, with five outpost towers to protect the city from external invasion.

- The Lion Tower (Borj Al-Sbaa`) is the only tower still standing today.
- Arabay was partially demolished, and a new building resembling a castle was built on top of its ruins.
- Al-Dewan was built by prince Terseddine Aytamash al-Jarkassly during the Ottoman rule (demolished).
- Sheikh-Affan is where two of El-Mina's oldest houses stand today.
- Ezzeddine was built by prince Sefeddine Jalaban in 1442, rubble of which still remains.

== Food and fish ==
- El-Mina Is also known with the fish market and restaurant.

== Landmarks ==
- The Lion Tower is the only remaining tower of the five protective towers built around the city during the Mamlouk period to protect the city from foreign invasions.
- Khan Al-Tamasili is an old Ottoman-style building that was an old marketplace during the Ottoman era.
- The Railway station Tripoli railway station is located in El-Mina.
- Abdul Wahab Island is the closest island and directly accessible via a bridge on the city promenade, and features a park, cafe and children's playground.

== Economics ==
El-Mina is mainly a service-oriented city.

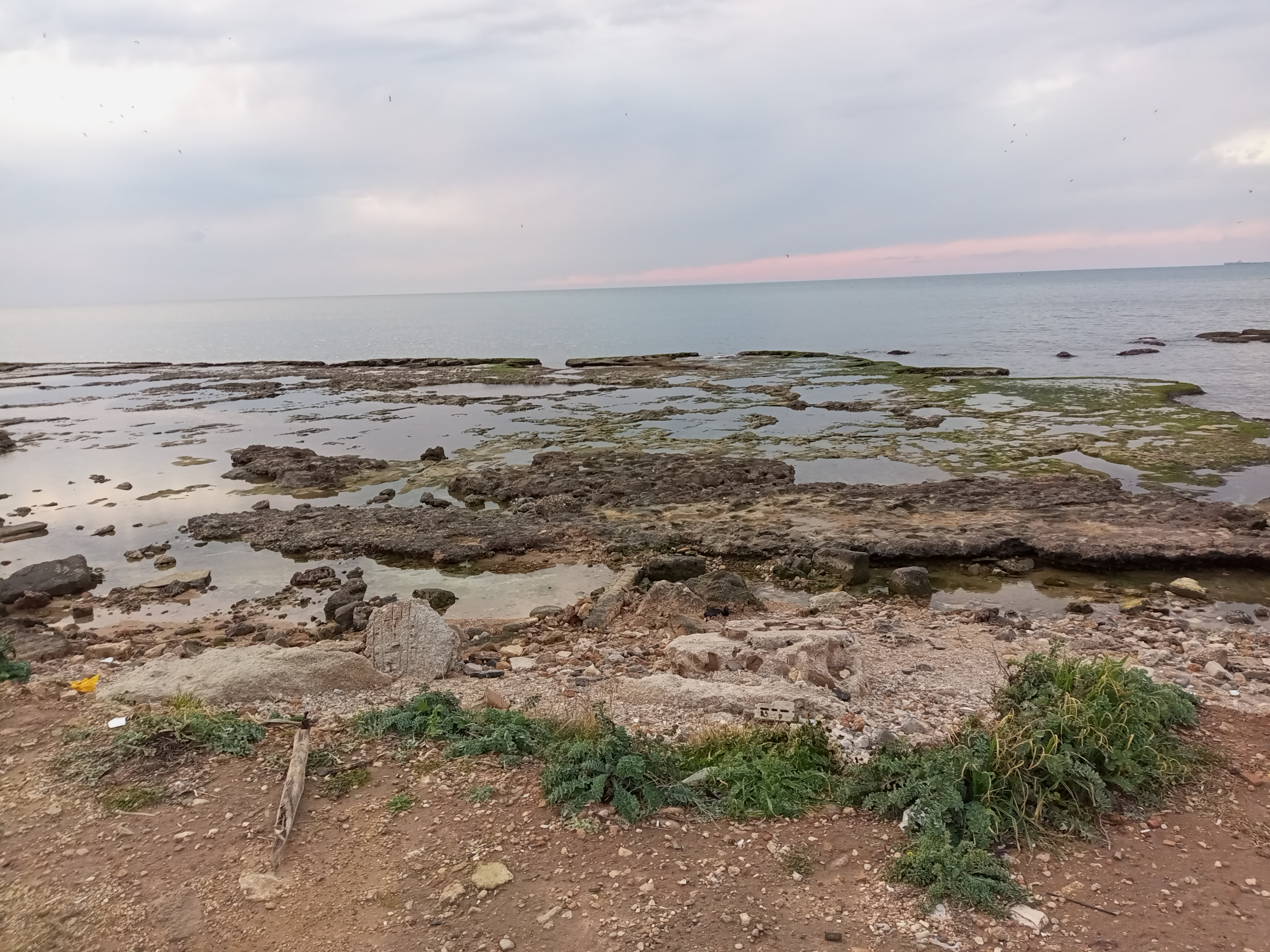
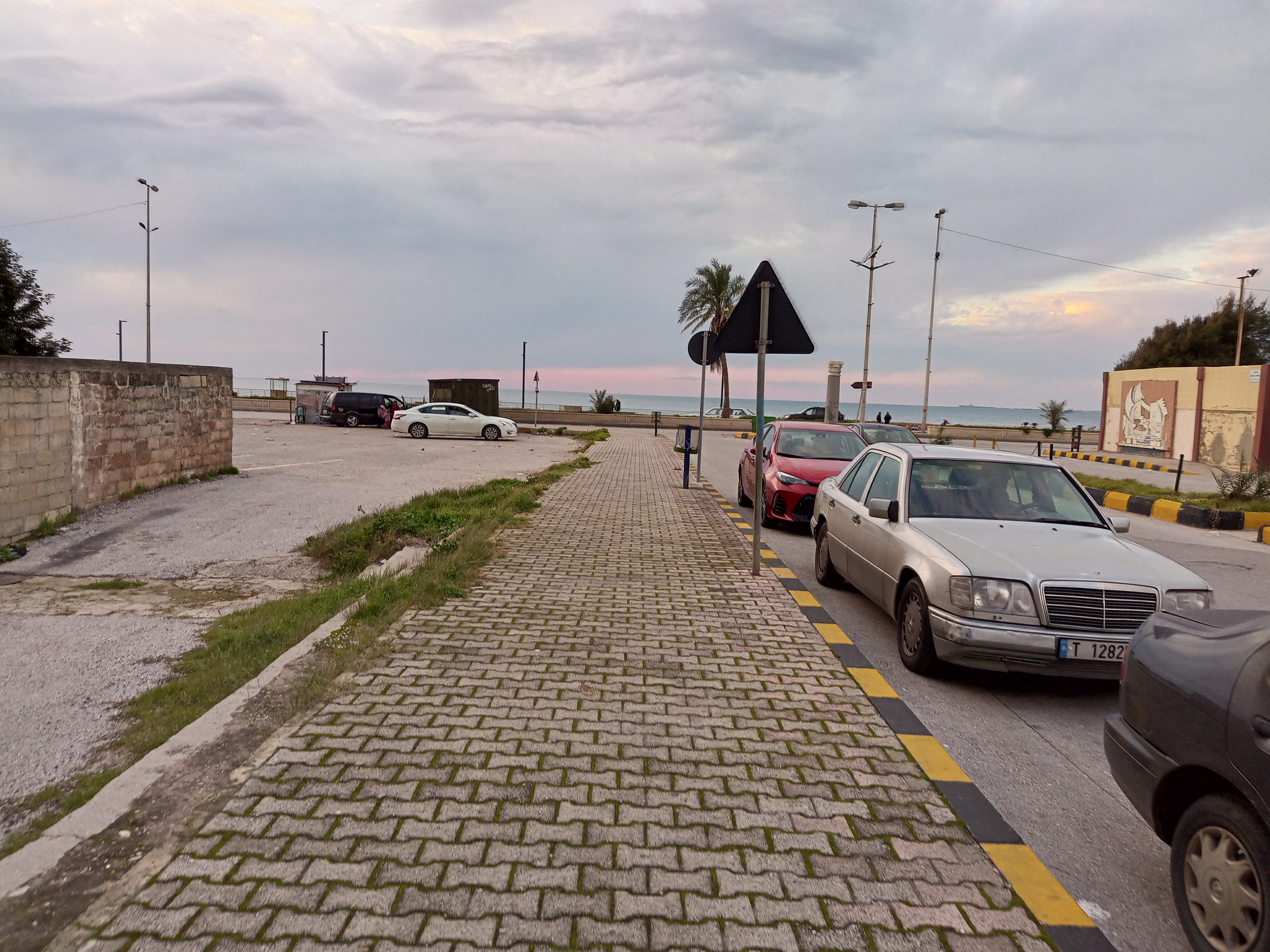
El Mina, Lebanon.

The city has a small harbor for fishing boats that hosts a considerable number of small fishing boats.

== Politics ==
Because of its location on the Mediterranean coast and its history as a trading hub, similar to metropolitan coastal cities such as Beirut, El-Mina is characterized by its diversity and rich political culture.

The Municipality of El-Mina is independent from Tripoli and it was established by the colonizers the Ottomans in 1882 with the Mayor being appointed by the Ottoman district governor and was held chronologically by:

- Ibrahim Alamedine (1882– by appointment)
- Mouheiddine Kabbara (by appointment)
- Rami Basha ( 1984 – by appointment)
- Mouheiddine Yafi (by appointment)

After the First World War, and during the French presence in Lebanon, mayoral position remained by appointment by the French district governor.

- Nour Alamedine (1920–1928)
- Moustafa Ghazi (1928–1933)

The French mandate introduced the municipal committee that would later become the city council.

- Abdel Satar Alamedine (1933–1935)
- Kheireddine Abdul Wahab (1933–1944)

The posts remained vacant between 1944 and 1947 after the independence of Lebanon, and the first elections were held in 1947.

- Mounir Alamoun (1947–1951)
- Saadi Ghazi (1951–1955)
- Habib Abdul Wahab (1955–1959)
- Saiid Bayakly (1960–1964)
- Ahmed Ghazi (1964–1968)
- Ahmed Moumtaz Kabara (1968–1972)
- Abdel Kader Alamedine (1972–1998)

With the eruption of the Lebanon Civil War in 1975, mayoral elections were no longer held till 1998, and Alamedine remained in office till then.

After the war, and the municipality became of 21 members (14 Muslims and 7 Christians by an oral agreement, the Mayor is a Sunni and his deputy is a Christian. In the first election in 1998, Alamedine was re-elected into office,

- Abdelkader Alamedine (1998–2001, resigned)
- Mouhamad Helou (2001–2004)
- Abdelkader Alamedine (2004–2010)
- Mohammad Issa (2010–2012)
- Vacant (2012–2016)
- AbdelKader Alamedine (2016–2019)
- (vacant due to suspended elections)
- Abdallah Kabbara (2025-Present)

In 2012, seven members of the city municipality council, that makes third of the council, resigned and thus made the whole council out of office and the municipality of Mina is under the Governor of Tripoli and the North responsibility until the elections of May 2016.

El Mina does not officially have a representative in the Lebanese Parliament, its people elect with the whole Tripoli district. Knowing that traditionally each parliamentary bloc of former Prime Minister Rachid Karami who was assassinated in 1986, representing North Lebanon, would have one member from El Mina.

== Notable people ==
- Youssef Hamadeh, former footballer
- Rachid Derbass, politician and former minister of social affairs

== See also ==
- Tripoli, Lebanon
- HMS_Victoria_(1887)
