= John Elliot (brewer) =

English brewer (1765–1829)

Lieutenant-Colonel John Elliot FRS (1765 – 27 March 1829) was a porter brewer who was lieutenant-colonel of the Westminster Volunteer Cavalry. He was head of the Elliott and Co. brewery of Pimlico, and treasurer of Westminster Hospital.

== Life ==
John Elliot was born to George Elliot and Margaret (Grant) Elliot. He matriculated at New College, Oxford in 1783, graduating B.A. in 1786, M.A. 1790. In 1804, he married Eliza Lettsom at St Margaret's, Westminster. Eliza was the youngest daughter of John Coakley Lettsom.

The couple had fifteen children, Sir Henry Miers Elliot being one of them who went on to become Foreign Secretary to the Government of India. Among his other children to have served in India, George Elliot served in the Bombay Cavalry, William served in the Madras Civil Service while Charles Morgan F.R.S served as Major Madras Engineers.

Elliot died on 27 March 1829 at Pimlico Lodge, Westminster.
