= Barsbay Tower =

Fortress in Tripoli, Lebanon

- برج السباع
- Part of the coastal defense fortifications of Mamluk Tripoli
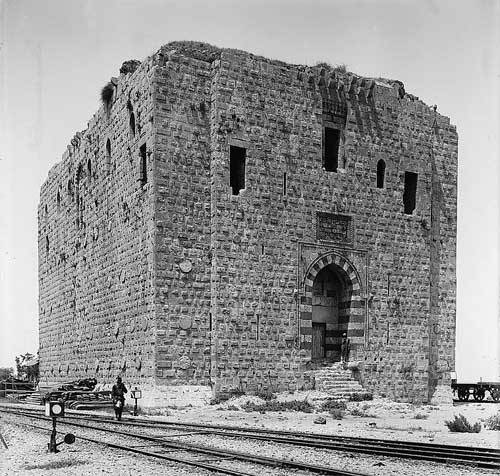
- Barsbay Tower at the turn of the 20th century

Site information
- Type: Fortress
- Open to the public: yes
- Condition: Mostly intact

Location
- Coordinates: 34.4498833°N 35.8280396°E

Site history
- Built: 15th century
- Built by: Sultan Al-Ashraf Sayf ad-Dīn Barsbāy
- Materials: Limestone, granite, wood

The Barsbay Tower (Arabic: برج برسباي, romanized: Burj Barsbay), also known as Lions Tower (Arabic: برج السباع, romanized: Burj es-Sibaa), is a small Mamluk military fortress located at the far eastern end of the Tripoli harbor in North Lebanon. Constructed during a period marked by ongoing conflicts with Crusader forces and later the rising Ottoman Empire, the tower was part of a defensive network aimed at protecting the coastal city of Tripoli from naval threats and is a remarkable example of Mamluk military architecture.

The tower features a distinctive portico with ablaq (alternating black-and-white ashlar stone stripes) and incorporates repurposed granite Roman columns embedded horizontally into its walls for structural reinforcement. Barsbay Tower's defensive architecture includes a sloping base, forming a small talus, a defensive design intended to deflect projectiles, and arrowslits. The tower features decorative relief moldings and remnants of heraldic symbols that hint at the structure's patrons.

== Location ==
The Barsbay Tower is located three kilometers (1.9 miles) from the center of Tripoli, on the coast, at the far eastern end of the Port of Tripoli in North Lebanon.

== History ==
=== Historical and architectural context ===
Mamluk military architecture developed in response to both the legacy of the Crusades and the strategic imperatives of coastal and inland defense following the consolidation of Mamluk power in the eastern Mediterranean. In the absence of a naval force, the Mamluk sultans, beginning with Sultan Baybars (r. 1260–1277), adopted a defensive strategy that prioritized inland control over the fortification of exposed harbors, deliberately dismantling most major coastal strongholds to prevent their reuse by Frankish fleets, only maintaining a few fortifications and towers. The earliest type of Mamluk fortification building corresponds to the period of the Crusades and the reign of Baybars. These structures were inspired by the towers developed by the Ayyubids at the beginning of the thirteenth century, exemplified by imposing quadrangular towers erected along the enceinte walls of major citadels such as those of Cairo and Damascus. Under Baybars, this architectural concept was adapted into an autonomous defensive structure: an independent tower-fort designed to function as a self-contained stronghold rather than as a flanking element of a curtain wall.

These tower-forts were characterized by their imposing mass and by the reinforcement of their angles with counterforts. Their primary function was the protection of vulnerable coastal zones, forming a line of advanced defensive outposts along the Mediterranean littoral. Although many examples of this typology were later dismantled by subsequent Mamluk sultans in favor of more ambitious and extensive construction projects, several representative monuments are documented In 1289, the Mamluks achieved their final victory over the Crusaders, who were forced out of Tripoli, while Crusader assaults against the coastal regions persisted, namely from the islands of Cyprus and Rhodes.

=== Construction ===
Historians estimate that the Lions Tower was built either in the 14th century during the reign of Sultan Barquq (r. 1382–1399), or in the 15th century under Sultan Barsbay. Mamluk historian Ibn Iyas, writing before his death in 1522, affirms that the tower was built by Barsbay while he was the Naib (deputy) of Tripoli in the 15th century. The tower was restored between 1441 and 1442 by Emir Julban, then the Naib of Tripoli, and by Sultan Qaitbay in the late 15th century, who, during his 1477 journey to Syria, inspected and reinforced the northern defenses against the growing Ottoman threat.

=== Later history ===
According to official Ottoman records, six of the Mamluk towers were still in use in the seventeenth century, each housing a military garrison, during that period, the Barsbay Tower was manned by thirteen guards (al-mustahfizan). On 22 June 1893, during a training maneuver off the coast of Tripoli facing the Barsbay Tower, the British Mediterranean fleet ships Victoria and Camperdown collided, resulting in the Victoria sinking. The fleet included the Dreadnought, Nile, Camperdown, Victoria, Inflexible, and seven other vessels, which had initially anchored in Beirut on a courtesy visit before sailing to Tripoli.

== Naming ==
The tower’s name has been debated, with some attributing it to the Mamluk Sultan Barsbay, who is credited with restoring the structure. Orientalist explorer Johann Ludwig Burckhardt recorded local accounts suggesting that reliefs of two lions once adorned its façade, which he interpreted as representing the Crusader heraldry of Raymond de Saint-Gilles. This interpretation was later picked up by orientalist Max van Berchem, and French historian Jean Sauvaget. The name has remained in use until this day. Modern scholars recognize that the lion is also a common symbol in Mamluk heraldry. Lebanese historian Umar Tadmuri affirms that Burj es-Sibaa is a corruption of Barsbay.

== Description ==
The rectangular tower measures 28.5 m (94 ft) long by 20.5 m (67 ft) wide, and is constructed with large bossed limestone blocks and comprises two levels. It features a distinctive portico with decorative ablaq-style stonework that combines white and black stone blocks, a style that characterizes Mamluk architecture. The portico of the tower is flanked by two projecting Roman granite column drums, and is accessed today via steps built in recent times. A decorative relief molding frames the portal, and above the door, a rectangular relief frame remains where the heraldic lion carvings, which likely inspired the tower's name, were once displayed but have since been removed. The walls of the tower are reinforced with granite Roman columns that were repurposed and embedded horizontally into the walls. All four exterior walls of the tower are punctuated with arrowslits, providing defensive positions for archers to shoot at approaching enemies while remaining shielded behind the stone fortifications. The base of the tower slopes outward, forming a small talus, a defensive feature designed to deflect stone missiles dropped from the machicolations above. The portico opens directly into the raised ground floor, consisting of a large hall spanning the entire surface of the building. The hall has six groin vaults anchored on two central supporting pillars and wall buttresses. In the center of the room, situated between the two large pillars, lies the opening of a cistern designed to collect rainwater. The water, which gathered on the terrace, was directed into the cistern through ceramic channels. Traces of paint and frescoes were discovered on the interior walls of the hall, including remnants of an inscribed band and five escutcheons featuring Mamluk coats of arms. Some of these escutcheons were in black, while others displayed vibrant colors. These coats of arms are composite in nature, with the most prominent symbol being the stemmed bowl of the cup-bearer, the emblem of Sultan Barquq. A staircase set inside the façade wall leads to the second level, and opens onto a small room that must have served religious purposes due to the presence of a mihrab, and a large room whose walls are inset with eight deep and spacious niches with barrel vaults. Above the main portal, the floor is pierced with five machicolations used to pour fluids on attackers. A staircase leads up to the terrace roof, where fragments of the original crenelated parapets that ran along the perimeter of the tower and a few machicolations remain.

The Lion Tower shares significant similarities with the courtyard built by Sultan Qaitbay over the entrance of the Aleppo Citadel. These structures align with the Mamluk sultan’s defense strategy against the Ottomans. French historian Jean Sauvaget notes that the Lion Tower, with its impressive mass and design, resembles the grand fortresses of Lebanon more than the smaller coastal towers. Its monumental scale and numerous decorative features, carefully arranged with balance and symmetry, align it more with religious or civil architecture than strictly utilitarian military buildings.
