= Manhal Al Habbobi =

Iraqi architect (born 1970)

Manhal Aziz Al-Habbobi
- منهل عزيز الحبّوبي
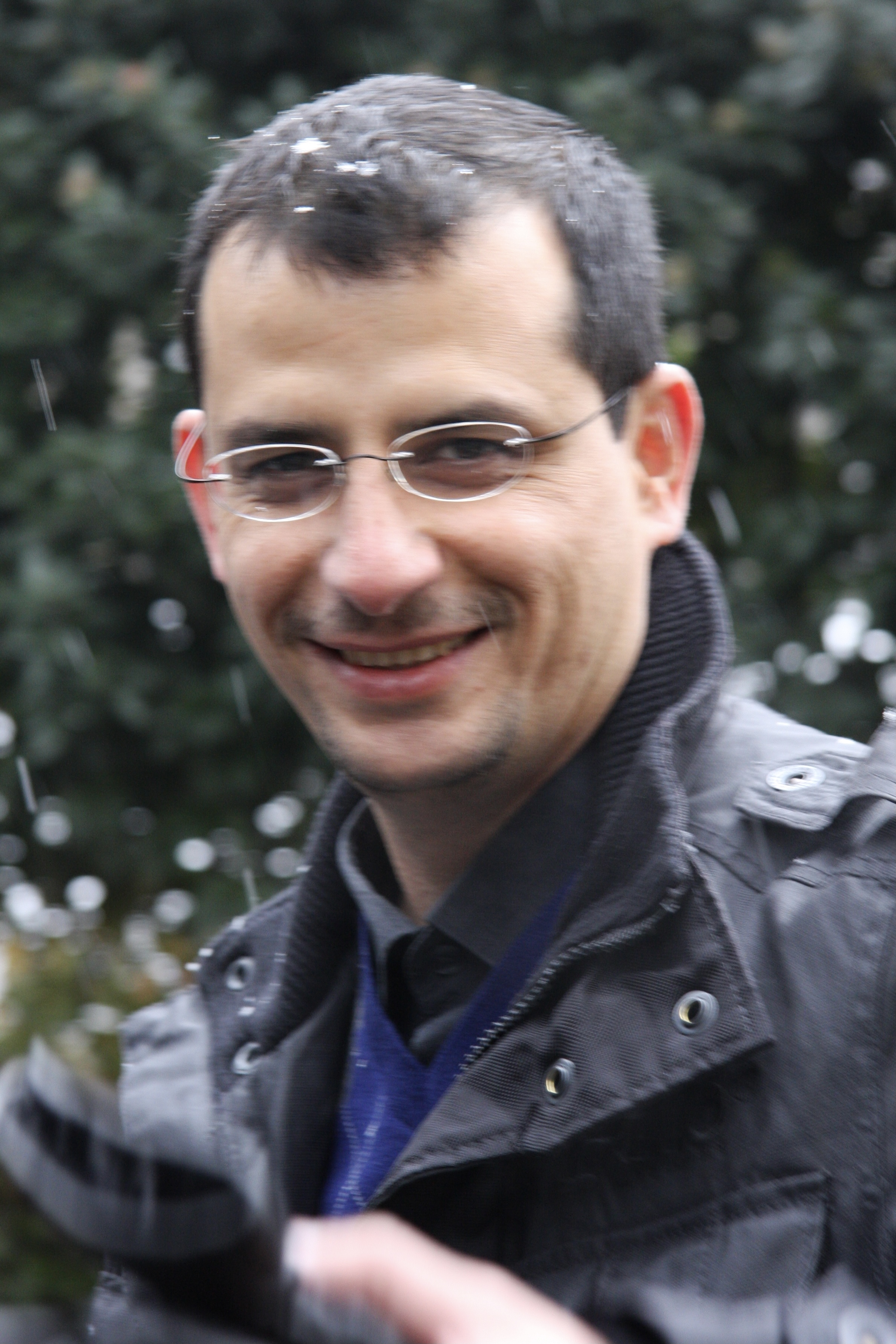
- Habbobi in Italy, February 2010

Mayor of Baghdad
- In office 20 September 2020 – 27 October 2020
- Preceded by: Zekra Alwach
- Succeeded by: Alaa Al-Amari

Personal details
- Born: 5 September 1970 Baghdad, Iraq
- Education: University of Baghdad
- Occupation: Architect
- Website: manhal-habbobi.co.uk

Manhal Aziz Al-Habbobi (Arabic: منهل عزيز الحبوبي; born 5 September 1970) is an Iraqi architect and former mayor of Baghdad. Recognised for his deeply philosophical approach to architecture, his style is said to promote a contemporary vision of Mesopotamian heritage. In September 2020, he was appointed Mayor of Baghdad, where he served the city until his resignation in late October the same year. During that time, it was announced that he was independent from any specific political party.

== Early life and education ==
Manhal Aziz Al-Habbobi was born on 5 September 1970 in Baghdad, Iraq. He studied architectural engineering at the University of Baghdad and graduated in 1995, then continued for his Master's degree in Philosophy of Architecture (2000).

== Career ==
Al-Habbobi began practising architecture in the late 90s, and has participated in several design competitions, the most notable of which being the design bid for the Iraqi General Secretariat of the Council of Ministers, where his award-winning design won first prize over that of the late Zaha Hadid’s as well as over thirty other international and local entries. He was then invited to go through the thought process behind his winning design in the first TED talks event in Baghdad.

On 20 September 2020, after being appointed by the Iraqi prime minister, Mustafa Al-Kadhimi, Al-Habbobi formally took up office as the Mayor of Baghdad, superseding Zekra Alwash and preceding the current mayor, Alaa' Al-Amary. During that time, he had been announced to be independent from any specific political party. However, his term proved short-lived when on 27 October 2020, he issued his resignation letter.

== See also ==
- Baghdad City
- List of mayors of Baghdad
