= Abd al-Wahhab Abu Zayd =

Saudi Arabian translator and poet

Abd al-Wahhab Khalil Abu Zayd (Arabic: عبد الوهاب أبو زيد) is a Saudi translator and poet. He publishes his poetic, literary, and translational works in Saudi newspapers. Among his best-known translations are works by the American singer and poet Bob Dylan.

== Publications ==
=== Books ===
- Li Ma Asha’a (I get what I want), a collection of poetry published by Al-Sharqiyyah Literary Club in 2008.
- Wala Qablaha Min Nesa'ain Wala Ba'adaha Min Ahad (No women exist neither before her nor after her) published by Dar Tawa in 2013.

=== Translations ===
- The Treasury of Sanskrit Poetry, published by the Kalimah project in 2012.
- Gheyab Alasal (Absent honey): selection of poems, by American poet Mark Strand. Published by Dar Mayara in Tunisia in 2017.
- Akhbar Alayyam (Chronicles), by the American poet and singer Bob Dylan. Published by Dar Alrewayat in 2018.
