= John Dowson =

British indologist

- Born: 1820; Uxbridge
- Died: 23 August 1881 (aged 60–61)
- Occupations: Indologist, professor, author
- Notable work: A Classical Dictionary of Hindu Mythology (1879)

John Dowson M.R.A.S.(1820 – 23 August 1881) was a British indologist. A noted scholar of Hinduism, he taught in India for much of his life. His book Classical Dictionary of Hindu Mythology remains one of the most comprehensive and authoritative works on the topic.

== Life ==
He was born at Uxbridge, and studied Eastern languages under his uncle Edwin Norris, whom he assisted for some years at the Royal Asiatic Society. He subsequently became a tutor at the East India Company College. In 1855, he was made professor of Hindustani both at University College, London, and at the Staff College, Sandhurst, a post he held till 1877. He died 23 August 1881.

== Works ==
Dowson's duties as professor suggested his Grammar of the Urdu or Hindustani Language (1862), and he also translated one of the tracts of the Ikhwānu-s-Safa, or Brotherhood of Purity. His major work was The History of India, as Told by Its Own Historians. The Muhammadan Period, which he edited from the papers of Henry Miers Elliot, in eight volumes (1867–77). He compiled the Classical Dictionary of Hindu Mythology and Religion, History and Literature (1879), and contributed to the Encyclopædia Britannica and the Journal of the Royal Asiatic Society. His theory of the Invention of the Indian Alphabet, claiming a Hindu origin, met with little support.
