= Abdul Wahab Khan =

Abdul Wahab Khan may refer to:

== Given name ==
- Abdul Wahab Khan (politician) (1898–1972), speaker of the National Assembly of Pakistan
- Abdul Wahab Khan (judge) (1924–2013), Bangladeshi judge
- Abdul Wahab Khan Tarzi (1903–1994), Afghan civil servant
