= Abdel Wahab El-Messiri =

Egyptian scholar, 1938-2008

- عبد الوهاب المسيري
- Website: www.elmessiri.com

Abdel-Wahab El-Messiri (Arabic: عبد الوهاب المسيري, 1938-2 July 2008) was an Egyptian scholar, author and general coordinator of the opposition organization Kefaya. Previously, he was a communist and later a member of the Muslim Brotherhood.

The author of some 50 books and numerous articles, his magnum opus was the eight-volume Encyclopedia of Jews, Judaism and Zionism.

== Early life and education ==
El-Messiri was born in Damanhur, Egypt, graduated with a BA in English literature from Alexandria University in 1959. He received an MA in English and comparative literature from Columbia University in 1964 and a PhD in the same field from Rutgers University in 1969. He was professor emeritus of English and comparative literature at Ain Shams University, Egypt, from 1988. He was also a university professor at King Saud University, Saudi Arabia (1983–1988) and at Kuwait University, Kuwait (1988–1989) and a visiting professor at the International Islamic University Malaysia.

== Writing career ==
El-Messiri's major areas of research included: Jews, Judaism and Zionism; secularism and prejudice; Western culture and contemporaneity; modernism and postmodernism; literary theory and comparative literature. Over the course of his life his outlook moved from western secularism to a modern Islamic vision. El-Messiri wrote several articles about his ideas, including "Chosen Community, an Exceptional Burden", "A People Like Any other". He has also written for children.

His eight-volume Encyclopedia of Jews, Judaism and Zionism (" موسوعة اليهود واليهودية والصهيونية: نموذج تفسيري جديد"), written in Arabic in an analytical/methodological form rather than an encyclopedic collection of information, is intended to provide analysis of the Middle East crisis, the history of Jews and the history of Zionism, as well as an in-depth analysis of Zionism, its ideology and beliefs, and ultimately the goals of such movement.

== Death ==
On July 2, 2008 he died after a very long battle against cancer at the Palestine Hospital, Cairo.

== Statements by Abdel Wahab El-Messiri ==
- "The functional nature of Israel means that it was created by the colonialism for a specific purpose. It is thus a colonial project that has nothing to do with Judaism".

== English language publications ==
- "Israel, Base of Western Imperialism" (Committee of Supporting Middle East Liberation, New York, 1969)
- A Lover from Palestine and Other Poems (Palestine Information Office, Washington D.C., 1972)
- Israel and South Africa: The Progression of a Relationship (North American, New Brunswick, N.J., 1976; second edition 1977; third edition, 1980; Arabic translation, 1980)
- The Land of Promise: A Critique of Political Zionism (North American, New Brunswick, N.J., 1977)
- Three Studies in English Literature (North American, New Brunswick, N.J., 1979)
- The Palestinian Wedding: A Bilingual Anthology of Contemporary Palestinian Resistance Poetry [editor] (Three Continents Press, Washington D.C., 1983)
- A Land of Stone and Thyme: Palestinian Short Stories [co-editor] (Quartet, London, 1996). Translated by Anthony Calderbank
- "Epistemological Bias in the Social and Physical Sciences" (International Institute of Islamic Thought, London - Washington, 2006)

== Bibliography ==
- Haggag Ali (2013) Mapping the Secular Mind: Modernity's Quest for a Godless Utopia. London: International Institute of Islamic Thought. ISBN 9781565645943
- Mahmoud Khalifa.(2025) "Abdelwahab Elmessiri’s Autobiography: Affect, Critique, and Modernity." Arab Studies Quarterly.Vol. 47(3):133-152. DOI: 10.13169/arabstudquar.47.3.0002
