= AbdulWahab al-Awdi =

Yemeni writers and economist (born 1978)

AbdulWahab al-Awdi عبد الوهاب العودي (born 10 August 1978) is an economist and international development professional from Yemen.

Member of the Yemeni Writers Union, his poems and writings have appeared in different local and international literary newspapers and Reviews. He has published two poetic works: «Maqamat I» (Ministry of Culture, Yemen, 2004), and «Maqamat II» (Ministry of Youth, Yemen, 2005) a State Incentive award-winning work. He also has compiled and edited the Anthology of the Contemporary Antiwar Arabic Poetry, in four volumes set.

He is one of the most active Yemeni writers who stood against war in Sa’da, and human rights violations in southern Yemen, as well as all over the country. He believes in real democracy and a modern civil state for a better Yemen.

He holds Master of Economics, Major Public Finance, from the National Graduate Institute for Policy Studies (GRIPS), at Tokyo, Japan 2011, and B.A. degree in English Language and Literature from Sana'a university (2002).
