= Abd al-Wahhab Adarrak =

Moroccan physician and poet

Abu Mohammed Abd al-Wahhab ibn Ahmad Adarrak (c. 1666 – 1746) was a well-known physician and poet from Fez, Morocco. He wrote a qasida in honour of the saints in Fes and works on medicine including a commentary on the Nushat of al-Antaki, a work on smallpox and one on syphilis. Adarrak also worked as a court physician for Moulay Ismail.

He was a descendant of a Berber family which ancestor left the Sous and settled at Fes in the 17th century. The Adarrak family produced many physicians and scientists.
