= Abdul Wahab Al-Nafisi =

Kuwaiti politician (1933–2024)

Minister of Trade and Industry
- In office 9 February 1975 – 24 February 1981
- Preceded by: Khaled Suleiman Al-Adsani
- Succeeded by: Jassim Al-Marzouq

Personal details
- Born: 1933 Kuwait City, Kuwait
- Died: 7 June 2024 (aged 90–91)
- Education: Cairo University
- Occupation: Civil servant

Abdul Wahab Al-Nafisi (Arabic: عبد الوهاب النفيسي; 1933 – 7 June 2024) was a Kuwaiti politician. He served as Minister of Trade and Industry from 1975 to 1981.

Al-Nafisi died on 7 June 2024.
