= The History of India, as Told by Its Own Historians =

Book of translations of medieval Persian chronicles by Henry Miers Elliot

The History of India, as Told by Its Own Historians is a book comprising translations of medieval Persian chronicles based on the work of Henry Miers Elliot. It was originally published as a set of eight volumes between 1867–1877 in London. The translations were in part overseen by Elliot, whose efforts were then extended and edited posthumously by John Dowson.

The book has been reprinted several times, and is also available online. Elliot was keen to contrast what he saw as the justice and efficiency of the British rule compared to cruelty and despotism of Muslim rule. He expressed hope that it "will make our native subjects more sensible of the immense advantages accruing to them under the mildness and equity of our rule."

== Background ==
Henry Miers Elliot was born in 1808. He was an administrator who worked for the British East India Company (EIC) and rose to the position of foreign secretary under the Governor-Generalships of Henry Hardinge and James Broun-Ramsay, 1st Marquess of Dalhousie. His academic capability in oriental languages, classics and mathematics enabled him to pass the open entrance examination for the EIC in 1826, foregoing the place at New College, Oxford that he had been expected to attend.

Elliot's interest in studies of India was indulged as a leisure pursuit throughout his time in the country and arose out of researches made by him in attempts to develop policies relating to land and revenue. British historians of India, such as Mountstuart Elphinstone, had largely ignored the rural aristocracy and fiscal matters, which Elliot believed could usefully be investigated by resort to hitherto neglected medieval chronicles. He saw his Bibliographical Index to the Historians of Mohammedan India , published in 1849, as a prelude to a study of 231 Arabic and Persian historians of India and also a resource that would prove to be of benefit to future historians. He said that he wanted his researches to be

... useful depositories of knowledge from which the labour and diligence of succeeding scholars may extract materials for the creation of a better and more solid structure.

Ill-health prevented Elliot from completing his more detailed study: he left India in search of a more amenable climate and died in 1853 at Simonstown, South Africa.

John Dowson was asked by Elliot's widow, Rebecca, to complete the work of her husband. Dowson had been born in 1820 and had held various teaching posts relating to oriental languages, of which he seems likely to have mastered Arabic, Persian, Sanskrit, Telugu and Hindustani. Those posts included a period as tutor at the EIC's Haileybury college, a professorship at University College, London and, from around 1859 until 1877, a professorship at the Staff College, Camberley. His efforts based on the work of Elliot resulted in the eight volumes titled The History of India, as Told by its Own Historians: the Muhammadan Period, published in London by Trübner & Co between 1867 and 1877. Around half of the material extracted from Elliot's bibliographic index were translated by Dowson himself (Note: In contradiction to Katherine Prior's assessment that Dowson translated around half of the material, Richard Eaton has said that "the bulk" was translated by Elliot.) and, according to Katherine Prior, he also left his mark by giving "... more of a historical emphasis than Elliot had planned." Some years later, Dowson began work on a volume concerning medieval Gujarat that was also based on Elliot's papers. This was incomplete at the time of his death in 1881 and was later published in a completely different form — as The History of India, as Told by Its Own Historians: The Local Muhammadan Dynasties: Gujarat — under the editorship of Edward Clive Bayley.

== Assessments ==
The literary work of Elliot was criticised around the time of his death. Francis H. Robinson wrote in 1853 that Elliot's evangelical trait tended to "criminate" those about whom he wrote. Dowson's academic reputation was established through his involvement in the project, although he did receive some criticism both of his competence and methods. Prior notes that, "Ironically, in the longer term, the apparent comprehensiveness of his work seriously retarded scholarly re-examination of the manuscripts on which it was based".

In 1903, Stanley Lane-Poole praised the efforts of Elliot and Dowson but also cautioned about it, saying:

To realise Medieval India there is no better way than to dive into the eight volumes of the priceless History of India as Told by its Own Historians which Sir H. M. Elliot conceived and began and which Professor Dowson edited and completed with infinite labour and learning. It is a revelation of Indian life as seen through the eyes of the Persian court annalists. It is, however, a mine to be worked, not a consecutive history, and its wide leaps in chronology, its repetitions, recurrences, and omissions, render it no easy guide for general readers.

Another Francis Robinson, writing in 2010, notes that the Elliott and Dowson work "... should always be read with Peter Hardy's Historians of Medieval India (Delhi, 1997) to hand."

Ramya Sreenivasan explains that the early and medieval historiography of India has often been approached in the form of dichotomic Hindu and Muslim categories, two strands of mutually exclusive political outlooks and cultures that have their origins in the two literary epic forms that generally, but not always, are typical of those periods. She notes that the effects of this can be seen in the works of later historians such as James Tod, another EIC administrator and gentleman-scholar, who strenuously favoured the notion of Hindu chivalry and Muslim deceitfulness while working in Rajputana.

Richard Eaton believes that present-day Hindu nationalists have "selectively used" Elliot and Dowson's "selective translations" in their efforts to denigrate pre-modern Muslim rulers. He says that

... Elliot, keen to contrast what he understood as the justice and efficiency of British rule with the cruelty and despotism of the Muslim rulers who had preceded that rule, was anything but sympathetic to the "Muhammadan" period of Indian history ... [He noted] the far greater benefits that Englishmen had brought to Indians in a mere half-century than Muslims had brought in five centuries ... Elliot's motives for delegitimising the Indo-Muslim rulers who had preceded English rule are thus quite clear.

Eaton states that Elliot saw the British rule as much superior in contrast to the Muslim rule and "was anything but sympathetic" to the Muhammadan period of Indian history. Elliot notes of far greater advantages to Indians under British rule than under Muslim rule and expressed hope that it "will make our native subjects more sensible of the immense advantages accruing to them under the mildness and equity of our rule."

Mohammad Habib, a nationalist historian who had presented his own secular view of Indian history by challenging the historical and translation methods of European colonial historians like Elliot, criticized him for focusing "inordinately" on the political activities of Muslim rulers instead of focusing on the lives of the people and their cultural activities. He blamed it on Elliot's reliance on faulty translations and not recognising the historical value of literary and cultural sources like masnavis and maktubat (Sufi literature).

== Contents ==
The contents are not complete translations of works. A. J. Arberry notes the Tabakat-i Nasiri, Tarikh-i Firoz Shahi and Zafarnama as being among those of which only parts were published (though in the last case, a chronicle of Timur, only a small part of the book concerned India). Arberry also points out that the quality of sources selected was variable and that the documents from which the translations were made were sometimes but one version of several that were available. (Note: Arberry believes, for example, that the Tabakat-i Nasiri lacks sufficient depth, that the Zafar-nama material was derived mainly from an abridgement and that the Tarikh-i 'Alai includes "some remarkable bombast".)

=== Volume I: Introduction ===
- Early Arab Geographers
- Historians of Sind

=== Volume II: To the Year A.D. 1260 ===
- Tarikhu-l Hind of Biruni
- Tarikh-i-Yamini of 'Utbi
- Tarikhu-s Subuktigin of Baihaki
- Jawami ul-Hikayat of Mohammad 'Aufi
- Taju-l Ma-asir of Hasan Nizami
- Kamilu-t Tawarikh of Ibn Asir
- Nizamu-t Tawarikh of Baizawi
- Tabakat-i Nasiri of Minhaju-s Siraj
- Jahan Kusha of Juwaini

=== Volume III: To the Year A.D. 1398 ===
- Jami'u-t Tawarikh, of Rashid-al-Din
- Tazjiyatu-l Amsar wa Tajriyatu-l asar, of 'Abdu-llah, Wassaf
- Tarikh-i Binakiti, of Fakhru-d din, Binakiti
- Tarikh-i Guzida, of Hamdu-lla, Mustaufi
- Tarikh-i 'Alai; or, Khazainu-l Futuh, of Amir Khusru: (History of Alauddin Khalji)
- Tarikh-i Firoz Shahi, of Ziauddin Barani: (History of Firuz Shah)
- Tarikh-i Firoz Shahi, of Shams-i Siraj, 'Afif
- Futuhat-i Firoz Shahi, of Sultan Firoz Shah
- Malfuzat-i Timuri, and Tuzak-i Timuri (supposedly Timur's memoirs but almost certainly a later fabrication)
- Zafar-nama, of Sharafu-d din, Yazdi

=== Volume IV: To the Year A.D. 1450 ===
- Tarikh-i Hafiz Abru
- Tarikh-i Mubarak Shahi, of Yahya bin Ahmad
- Matla'u-s Sa'dain, of Abdur Razzaq
- Rawżat aṣ-ṣafāʾ, of Mirkhond
- Khulasatu-l Akhbar, of Khondamir
- Dasturu-l Wuzra, of Khondamir
- Habib al-Siyar, of Khondamir
- Tarikh-i Ibrahimi; or, Tarikh-i Humayuni, of Ibrahim bin Hariri
- Tuzk-e-Babri; or, Waki'at-i Babari: The Autobiography of Babur
- Tabakat-i Babari, of Shaikh Zain
- Lubbu-t Tawarikh, of Yahya bin 'Abdu-l Latif
- Nusakh-i Jahan-ara, of Kazi Ahmad
- Tarikh-i Sher Shahi; or, Tuhfat-i Akbar Shahi, of 'Abbas Khan Sarwani
- Tarikh-i Daudi, of 'Abdu-lla

=== Volume V: End of the Afghan Dynasty and the First Thirty-Eight Years of the Reign of Akbar ===
- Tarikh-i Salatin-i Afaghana, of Ahmad Yadgar
- Makhzan-i-Afghani and Tarikh-i Khan-Jahan Lodi, of Ni'amatu-lla
- Humayun-nama, of Khondamir
- Tarikh-i Rashidi, of Haidar Mirza Doghlat
- Tazkiratu-l Waki'at, of Jauhar
- Tarikh-i Alfi, of Maulana Ahmad and others
- Tabakat-i Akbari, of Nizamuddin Ahmad, Bakhshi
- Muntakhab al-Tawarikh; or, Tarikh-i Badauni, of Mulla `Abd al-Qadir Bada'uni

=== Volume VI: Akbar and Jahangir ===
- Akbar-nama of Shaikh Abu-l Fazl
- Takmila-i Akbar-nama of 'Inayatu-lla
- Akbar-nama of Shaikh Illahdad Faizi Sirhindi
- Waki'at of Shaikh Faizi
- Wikaya of Asad Beg
- Tarikh-i Hakki of Shaikh 'Abdu-l Hakk
- Zubdatu-t Tawarikh of Shaikh Nuru-l Hakk
- Rauzatu-t Tahirin of Tahir Muhammad
- Muntakhabu-t Tawarikh; or, Ahsanu-t Tawarikh of Hasan bin Muhammad
- Tarikh-i Firishta of Muhammad Kasim Hindu Shah Firishta
- Ma-asir-i Rahimi of Muhammad 'Abdu-l Baki
- Anfa'u-l Akhbar of Muhammad Amin
- Tarikh-i Salim Shahi; Tuzak-i Jahangiri of the Emperor Jahangir
- Dwazda-Sala-i Jahangiri; Waki'at Jahangiri of the Emperor Jahangir
- Tatimma-i Waki'at-i Jahangiri of Muhammad Hadi
- Ikbal-nama-i Jahangiri of Mu'tamad Khan
- Ma-asir-i Jahangiri of Kamgar Khan
- Intikhab-i Jahangiri-Shahi
- Subh-i Sadik of Sadik Isfahani

=== Volume VII: From Shah-Jahan to the Early Years of the Reign of Muhammad Shah ===
- Padshahnama, of Muhammad Amin Kazwini
- Badshah-nama, of Abdul Hamid Lahori
- Shah Jahan-nama, of 'Inayat Khan
- Badshah-nama, of Muhammad Waris
- 'Amal-i Salih, of Muhammad Salih Kambu
- Shah Jahan-nama, of Muhammad Sadik Khan
- Majalisu-s Salatin, of Muhammad Sharif Hanafi
- Tarikh-i Mufazzali, of Mufazzal Khan
- Mir-at-i 'alam, Mir-at-i Jahan-numa, of Bakhtawar Khan
- Zinatu-t Tawarikh, of 'Azizu-llah
- Lubbu-t Tawarikh-i Hind, of Rai Bhara Mal
- 'alamgir-nama, of Muhammad Kazim
- Ma-asir-i 'alamgiri, of Muhammad Saki Musta'idd Khan
- Futuhat-i 'alamgiri, of Muhammad Ma'sum
- Tarikh-i Mulk-i asham, of Shahabu-d din Talash
- Wakai', of Ni'amat Khan
- Jang-nama, of Ni'amat Khan
- Ruka'at-i 'alamgiri, of the Emperor Aurangzeb
- Muntakhab-al Lubab, of Khafi Khan
- Tarikh, of Iradat Khan
- Tarikh-i Bahadur Shahi
- Tarikh-i Shah 'alam Bahadur Shahi
- 'Ibrat-nama, of Muhammad Kasim

=== Volume VIII: To End of the Muhammadan Empire in India ===
- Mukhtasiru-t Tawarikh
- Khulasatu-t Tawarikh, of Subhan Rai
- Haft Gulshan-i Muhammad-Shahi, of Muhammad Hadi Kamwar Khan
- Tazkira-i Chaghatai, of Muhammad Hadi Kamwar Khan
- Tarikh-i Chaghatai, of Muhammad Shafi, Teharani
- Burhanu-l Futuh, of Muhammad Ali
- Kanzu-l Mahfuz
- Tarikh-i Hindi, of Rustam Ali
- Tarikh-i Nadiru-z Zamani, of Khushhal Chand
- Jauhar-i Samsam, of Muhammad Muhsin Sadiki
- Tazkira, of anand Ram Mukhlis
- Nadir-nama, of Mirza Muhammad Mahdi
- Tahmasp-nama, of Miskin
- Bahru-t Tawarikh
- Muhammad-nama
- Tarikh-i Muhammad Shahi, of Yusuf Muhammad Khan
- Tarikh-i Ahmad Shah
- Bayan-i Waki, of Khwaja Abdu-l Karim Khan
- Tarikh-i 'alamgir-sani
- Tarikh-i Manazilu-l Futuh, of Muhammad Ja'far Shamlu
- Jam-i Jahan-numa, of Muzaffar Husain
- Farhatu-n Nazirin, of Muhammad Aslam
- Tarikh-i Faiz Bakhsh, of Sheo Parshad
- Hadikatu-l Akalim, of Murtaza Husain
- Jam-i Jahan-numa, of Kudratu-llah
- Ma-asiru-l Umara, of Shah Nawaz Khan Samsamu-d daula
- Tazkiratu-l Umara, of Kewal Ram
- Sawanih-i Akbari, of Amir Haidar Husaini
- Siyaru-l Muta-akhkhirin, of Ghulam Husain Khan
- Mulakhkhasu-t Tawarikh, of Farzand Ali Husain
- Tarikh-i Mamalik-i Hind, of Ghulam Basit
- Chahar Gulzar Shuja'i, of Hari Charan Das
- Tarikh-i Shahadat-i Farrukh Siyar, of Mirza Muhammad Bakhsh
- Waki'at-i Azfari
- Bahru-l Mawwaj, of Muhammad Ali Khan Ansari
- Ibrat-nama, of Fakir Khairu-d din Muhammad
- Chahar Gulshan, of Ram Chatar Man
- Tarikh-i Ibrahim Khan
- Lubbu-s Siyar, of Abu Talib Londoni
- Ausaf-i asaf
- Tarikh, of Jugal Kishwar
- Gulistan-i Rahmat, of Nawab Mustajab Khan
- Gul-i Rahmat, of Sa'adat Yar Khan
- Sahihu-l Akhbar, of Sarup Chand
- Tarikh-i Muzaffari, of Muhammad Ali Khan
- Shah-nama, or Munawwaru-l Kalam, of Sheo Das
- Ikhtisaru-t Tawarikh, of Sawan Singh
- Mir-at-i Aftab-numa, of Shah Nawaz Khan
- Intikhabu-t Tawarikh, of Mirza Masita
- Sa'adat-i Jawed, of Harnam Singh
- Ma'danu-s Sa'adat, of Saiyid Sultan Ali
- Majma'u-l Akhbar, of Harsukh Rai
- Kashifu-l Akhbar, of Inayat Husain
- Zubdatu-l Akhbar, of Umrao Singh
- Muntakhab-i Khulasatu-t Tawarikh, of Ram Parshad
- Akhbar-i Muhabbat, of Nawab Muhabbat Khan
- Tarikh-i Shah 'alam, of Manu Lal
- Shah 'alam-nama, of Ghulam Ali Khan
- Imadu-s Sa'adat, of Mir Ghulam Ali
- Nigar-nama-i Hind, of Saiyid Ghulam Ali
- Muntakhabu-t Tawarikh, of Sadasukh
- Ashrafu-t Tawarikh, of Kishan Dayal
- Jinanu-l Firdaus, of Mirza Muhammad Yusufi
- Tarikh-i Henry, of Saiyid Muhammad Bakir Ali Khan
- Balwant-nama, of Fakir Khairu-d din Muhammad
- Yadgar-i Bahaduri, of Bahadur Singh
- Jami'u-t Tawarikh, of Fakir Muhammad
- Jam-i Jam, of Saiyid Ahmad Khan
- Majma'u-l Muluk and Zubdatu-l Gharaib, of Muhammad Riza
- Akhbarat-i Hind, of Muhammad Riza
- Miftahu-t Tawarikh, of Thomas William Beale

== See also ==
- History of India
- Mughal Empire
- Muslim conquests in the Indian subcontinent
- History of Pakistan
- History of Bangladesh
