= Abdul Wahab Wardak =

Afghan military official

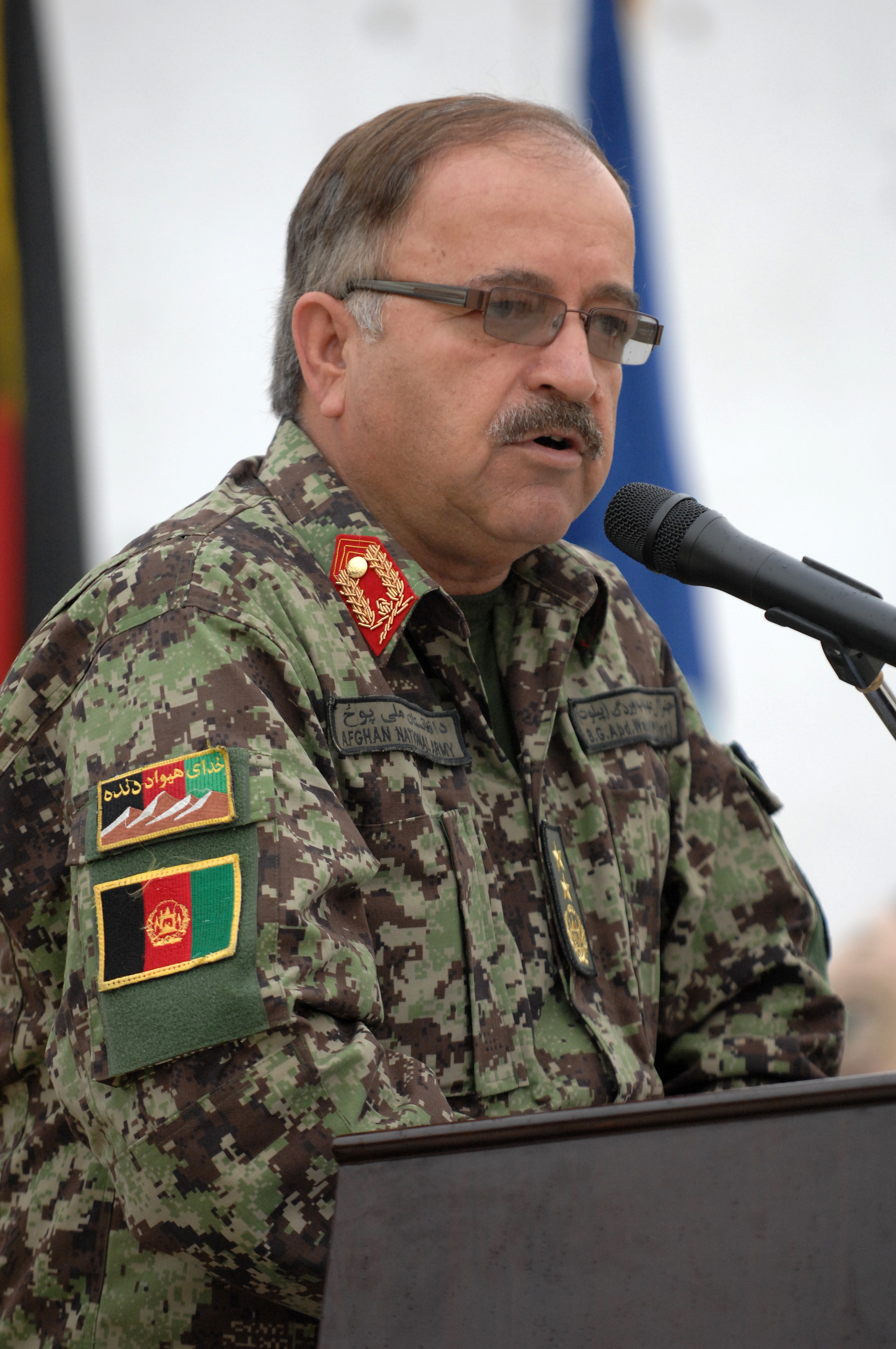
- Abdul Wahab Wardak in 2011
- Military career
- Allegiance: Democratic Republic of Afghanistan; Afghanistan
- Branch: Afghan Air Force (1978–1992); Afghan Air Force
- Rank: Major General
- Commands: Afghan Air Force
- Conflicts: Soviet-Afghan War; Afghan Civil War (1989–1992); Afghan Civil War (1992–1996); Afghan Civil War (1996–2001); War in Afghanistan (2001–2021); Taliban insurgency

Major General Abdul Wahab Wardak is from the Wardak Province of Afghanistan, and he is the Afghan Air Force Commander. He once served as a MIG-21 fighter jet pilot for the Afghan communist regime's military in the 1980s during the Soviet–Afghan War. He is an ethnic Pashtun.
