= Abdulwahab Alamrani =

Yemeni author and diplomat

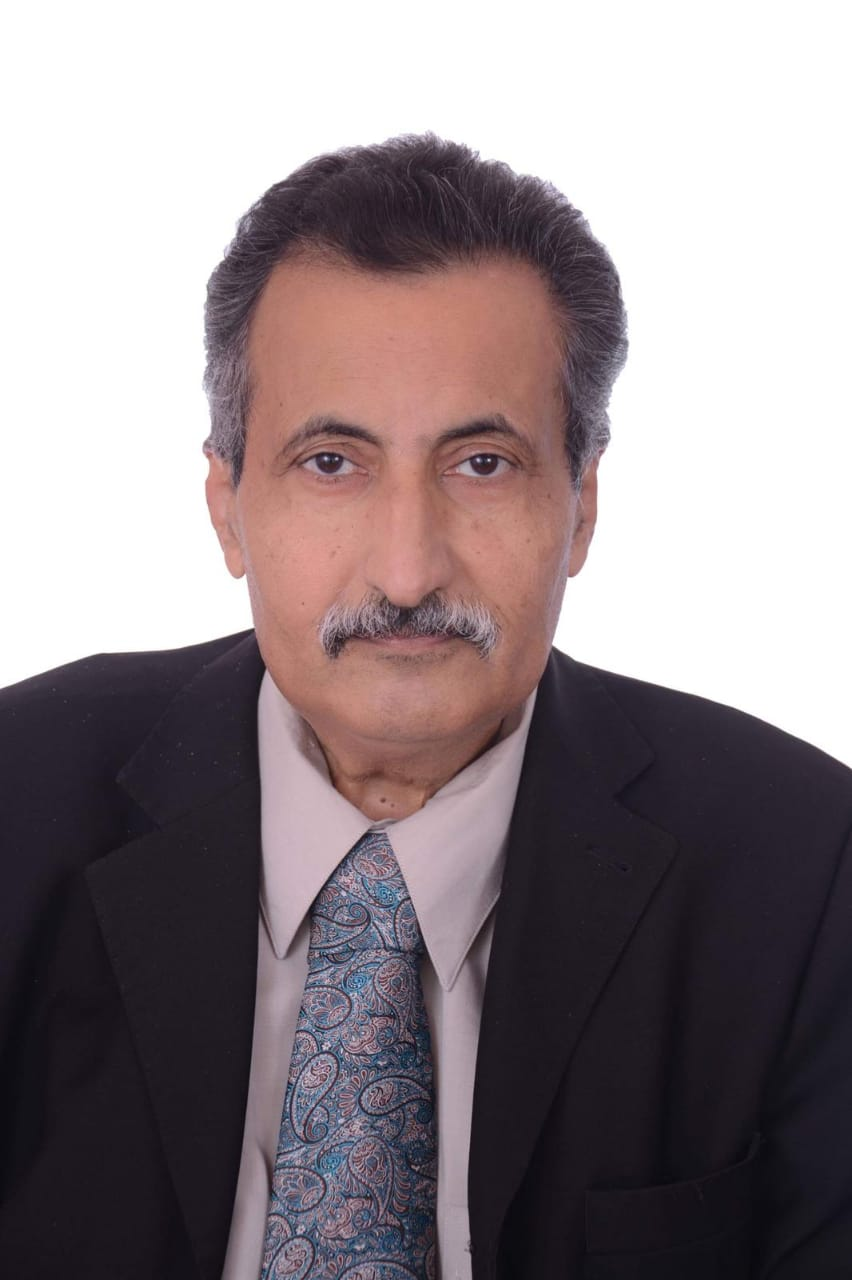
- Born: 1958 (age 67–68); Sana'a, Yemen
- Education: University of Baghdad
- Occupations: Diplomat, author

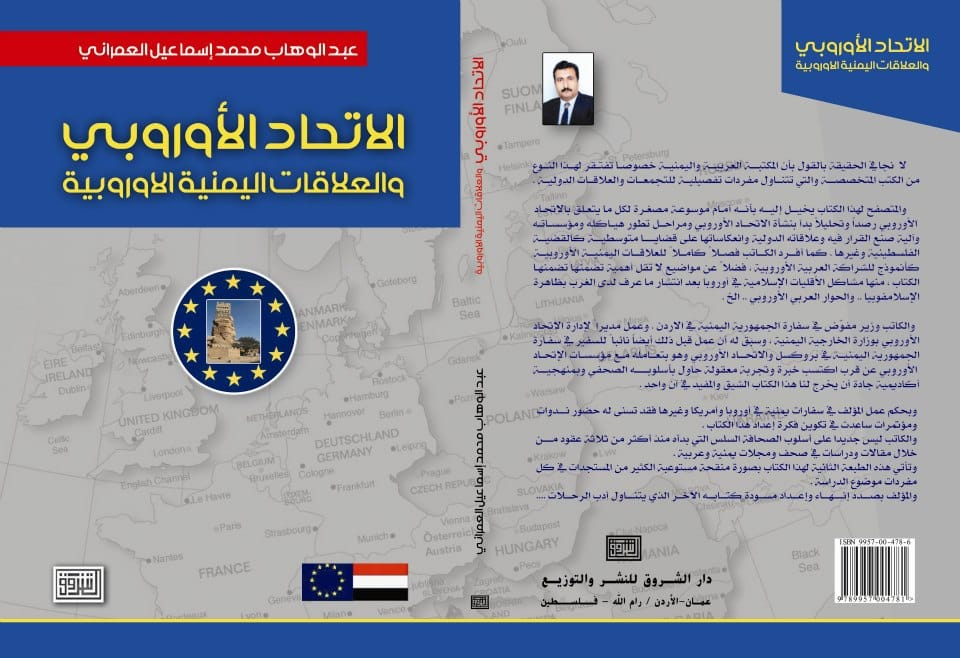

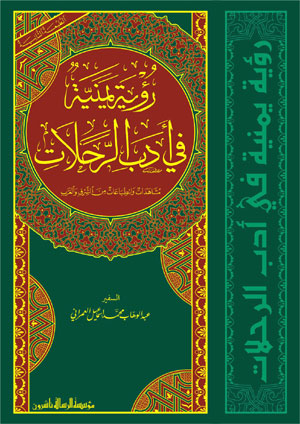
Literature Trips from Yemeni vision.

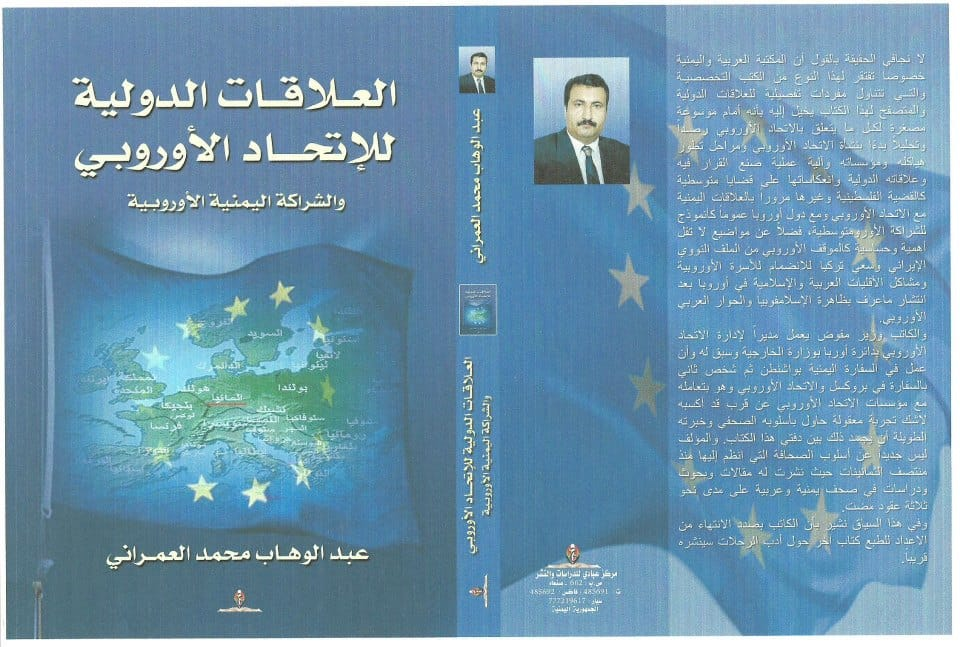

Abdulwahab Alamrani (Arabic: عبد الوهاب العمراني) is a Yemeni diplomat who previously served as ambassador. He is also an author and traveler.

== Early life ==
Alamrani was born in 1958 in the old city of Sana'a in Yemen. His father is a well-known public figure in Yemen, a scholar and judge in Islamic Sharia’a and the Mufti of the Republic of Yemen Allama Mohammed bin Ismail Al Amrani.

== Education ==
He completed his preliminary studies in Yemen, then continued in the University of Baghdad, College of Political Science, and after graduating Bachelor in political science with a "B” grade, he continued his postgraduate studies and was awarded a higher diploma in International Politics.

== Career ==
Alamrani joined the diplomatic corps in the mid-eighties until he became ambassador in the Yemeni Foreign Ministry. He represented his country in Yemen's missions to Arab countries, Europe and America. He also participated as a member of the Yemeni delegation in international conferences such as the Non-Aligned Summit and the Organization of Islamic Cooperation.

During his career, Alamrani received invitations from Arab and international scientific bodies, organizations and institutions to participate and attend seminars and political, cultural, intellectual and social activities, in Brussels and the European Union, on the one hand, and on bilateral relations between the European Union and Yemen or the European Union relations, on the other, including a conference on religions (Christian, Islamic, Muslim) in Brussels when he was in office in the Yemeni Mission in Belgium and the European Union. He also attended similar events in Washington, D.C. and other capitals. He also participated in cultural events and seminars inside Yemen.

During office at the Embassy to Washington in the nineties, he was awarded membership of the Academy of Political Science after publishing a study in an American magazine specializing in political development. He visited about thirty-five countries, whether officially or privately and mentioned them in his literary book "Yemeni vision in travel literature", observations and impressions from East and West. His name appeared in the International Encyclopedia as a diplomatic figure, who was given the opportunity to travel and see round the world. He wrote his memoirs in articles specialized in travel literature and collected them in his book, which became part of the international encyclopedia (Yokopedia). His name was included within the Yemeni Encyclopedia for Media and Authors of Yemen, which is a comprehensive knowledge encyclopedia of twenty volumes on the past and present most prominent Yemeni figures, devoting a full-page to his biography as a diplomat and author.

Alamrani began press-writing at an early age and published a series of articles in Yemeni and Arabic newspapers that were characterized by sharp criticisms of the foreign policy of the regime, to the extent that he was banned from writing by the Yemeni authorities for years. He returned to writing after the fall of the regime of President Ali Abdullah Saleh following the revolution that broke out in Yemen in early 2011. He was banned again from writing in early February 2014 along with some ambassadors who write in the newspapers, because of their continuous criticism of corruption and performance of the government as well as their criticism of foreign policy and state formation, especially with regard to federalism and the outcomes of the national dialogue, although there are Yemeni diplomats and ambassadors who write in the newspapers to-date without being prosecuted or banned because they are affiliated with political, partisan or family power centers. Observers believe that the reason for this ban is because the change has not been complete in Yemen, and oppression of freedom continues according to the mood of those in power in the post-11 February revolution.

The incidence of harassment in Yemen has increased for journalists and politicians, and freedom of opinion has completely disappeared during the last six years following the fall of Sana’a, the Yemeni capital, in the hands of the Houthi militia in September 2014. Oppression of freedoms has reached its utmost due to the war. Violations against local and regional human rights bodies and organizations and against authors and influential figures, whether political or cultural, reached a record during the war years.

Alamrani had left Yemen a few weeks after the period between the fall of Sana'a in the hands of the Houthis and the outbreak of the war to receive treatment outside Yemen. Large numbers of Yemenis had left Yemen, some of whom had political stands such as writers, media specialists and diplomats, including "the author of this biography", the writer and author Abdul Wahab Alamrani, who is persecuted by the Houthi authorities inside Yemen, and whose family cannot return to Yemen in these circumstances. Yemen has become an insecure region, whether in the north (the Houthis) or in the south (which is controlled by the Emirates and the coalition countries that are waging war on Yemen).

While the legitimate government itself spent more than five years outside Yemen, and because the writer Alamrani continued to criticize corruption and lack of respect for human rights of all the conflicting parties in Yemen, whether the illegal militia (the Houthi and the Southern Movement) or the internationally recognized legal authority that lies outside Yemen, the outcome of the absence and corruption of the legal government was reflected on the lives of many Yemeni.

Alamrani, even though he was an official employee in the diplomatic corps of the internationally recognized Yemeni legitimate government, the latter's position is no longer loyal to its Employees. It shirked its obligations towards the people and educated elites, and because of Alamrani's writings in the media against the coalition countries and their aggressive policy against the Yemeni people, his rights were undermined as he criticizes both the Yemeni state administration and coalition. The government deprived him of his presumed employment rights, which further increased restrictions on him by the legitimate Yemeni government which he is supposed to belong to, because of his criticism of the crimes of the so-called Arab coalition that launched a war against Yemen and the silence of the legitimate government that he was supposed to belong to for war crimes.

== Positions ==
- Ambassador in the Foreign Ministry of Republic of Yemen.
- Member of the Yemeni Journalists Union in Yemen and the Arab region.
- Honorary Member of the Academy of Political Science of the United States Abulwab Al Amrani's trips and visits to many countries in the world helped him crystallizing and authoring his views and observation into the following political and literary books:
1. European Union and European relations of Yemen.
2. International Relations of the European Union and the European Partnership Yemen.
3. Literature Trips from Yemeni vision.
4. A book still in draft form/ under preparation (cultural touch between the Arabs and their neighbors).

== See also ==
- Outline of the Yemeni crisis, revolution, and civil war (2011-present)
