= Zamzani Abdul Wahab =

Malaysian chef (born 1970)

- Born: Zamzani bin Abdul Wahab; 19 April 1970 (age 56); Kuala Terengganu, Terengganu, Malaysia
- Education: Universiti Teknologi MARA (UiTM)

Zamzani Abdul Wahab (born 19 April 1970), popularly known as Chef Zam, is a Malaysian celebrity chef.

== Background and education ==
Chef Zam was born and raised in Kuala Terengganu where he practised cooking in the kitchen with his mother since the age of 7 years old. He obtained a Diploma in Chef Training from Universiti Teknologi Mara (UiTM) in 1993. After that, he worked as a chef in several hotels before pursuing an Associate of Science in Hotel-Restaurant Management and a Bachelor's Degree in Hotel-Restaurant/Institutional Management both from Johnson and Wales University, USA as a MARA scholar. Chef Zam worked in New York for three years upon graduation. While being employed at the Malaysia Tourism Promotion Board, New York, he participated in the organization of the month-long 'Malaysian Food & Cultural Promotions' (1997), housed at the United Nations building. In 2003, he got his Master's Degree in Hospitality Management from Thames Valley University, London. During his studies and as part of the Teaching Scholarship requirements, he was also tasked to teach the Junior Chefs Academy classes, mainly attended by European, African other international students alike. He was also commissioned by MATRADE (London) as well as Tourism Malaysia (London) to assist with promoting Malaysian food products in the UK & Scotland. He was also featured at the International Food Exhibition (IFE) 2005.

== Career ==
He has appeared in a wide varieties of television productions in Malaysian, Singapore, the Netherlands, (cooking programs, travelogues, sitcoms, dramas, telemovies, talk shows, etc. such as Garam Gula, Citarasa Selebriti, Ole-ole Malaysia, Serimas...Selera Dunia, Aroma Selebriti, Chef Selebriti Realiti TV (Suria TV, Singapore), Sajian Ramadhan 2008, Biscotti, Dapur Chef Zam, etc. As a Celebrity Chef in Malaysia, Chef Zam had also served as the Brand Ambassador for Philips Malaysia, Heinz ABC, Harvey Norman, Barilla, Colavita, and is currently attached to BOSCH Home Malaysia. Besides that, he is working with a myriad of well-known brands local as well as international brand names on special campaigns alike.

Chef Zam began producing his own TV cookery shows for local TV stations i.e. RTM, TVOkey and the likes. To date, he has successfully produced a total of 6 cooking series, two Telemovies and counting.
