= Abdul Wahab Mohammed Latif Al Mufti =

Abdul Wahab Mohammed Latif Al Mufti, also known as Abdul Wahab Mufti (died 1987), was an Iraqi politician. He served as the mayor of Baghdad from 1981 to 1987. He was hanged for corruption with a British company in 1987.
