= Mohammed ibn Abd al-Wahab al-Ghassani =

Moroccan diplomat (died 1707)

Mohammed ibn Abd al-Wahhab al-Wazir al-Ghassani (Arabic: محمد بن عبد الوهاب الغساني; died 1707), also spelled as Mohamed al-Ghassani, was a Moroccan ambassador to Spain for the Moroccan Sultan Moulay Ismail.

Al-Ghassani is known for his account of his journey to Spain in 1690–1691, entitled Rihlat al-Wazir fi Iftikak al-Asir (The Journey of the Minister to Ransom the captive). The purpose of his diplomatic mission was to ransom a number of Moroccan captives held in Spain.

Al-Ghassani describes the social, religious and administrative characteristics of Spanish life and culture. At the end of his account he writes the story of the conquest of Andalusia. Much of the account is filled with regret over the loss of Andalusia to the Spanish Christians.

== Bibliography ==
- Juan Vernet, "Embajada de al-Gassani (1690–1691)", in: Al-Andalus: revista de las Escuelas de Estudios Árabes de Madrid y Granada, ISSN 0304-4335, Vol. 18, Nº 1, 1953, 109–131
- Muhammad ibn Abd al-Wahhab Wazir al-Ghassani, Abd al-Rahim Bin-Haddah, Safir Maghribi Fi Madrid Fi Nihayat Al-Qarn Al-Sabi ashr: Rihlat Al-Wazir Fi Iftikak Al-Asir, Manshurat Mahad al-Abhath fi lughat wa-thaqafat Asya wa-afriqya, ISBN 4-87297-907-9
