= Henry Miers Elliot =

English civil servant and historian

Sir Henry Miers Elliot KCB
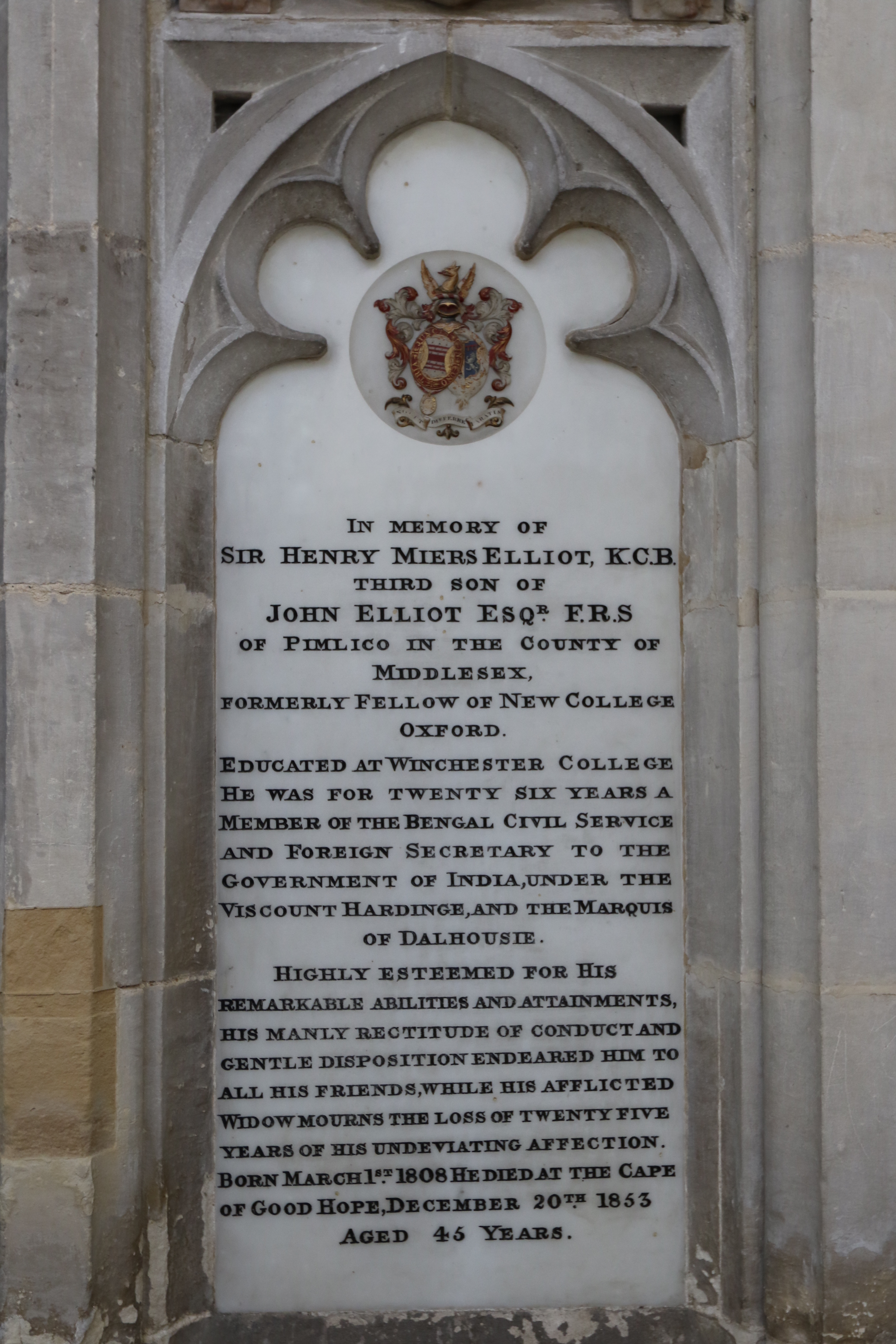
- Memorial in Winchester Cathedral
- Born: 1 March 1808; Westminster, England
- Died: 20 December 1853 (aged 45); Simon's Town, Cape Colony
- Occupation: East India Company civil servant

Sir Henry Miers Elliot KCB (1 March 1808 – 20 December 1853) was an English civil servant and historian who worked with the East India Company in India for 26 years. He is most known for The History of India, as Told by Its Own Historians based on his works, published posthumously in eight volumes, between 1867–1877 in London.

== Early life and background ==
Elliot was born on 1 March 1808. He was the third son, one of fifteen children, of John Elliot, of Pimlico Lodge, Westminster, colonel commandant of the Westminster volunteers, and his wife, a daughter of John Coakley Lettsom, M.D. He was educated from the age of ten at Winchester College, and destined for New College, Oxford; but the demand of the East India Company for civilians beyond the numbers regularly trained at Haileybury tempted him to try for an appointment in their service, and he was the first of the 'competition wallahs' to pass an open examination for an immediate post in India. His oriental languages as well as his classics and mathematics proved so good that he was even placed by himself in an honorary class (1826).

== Career and family ==
Elliot was assistant successively to the collector of Bareilly, the political agent at Delhi, and the collector of the southern division of Muradabad; secretary to the Sudder board of Revenue for the North-Western Provinces; and (1847) secretary to the governor-general in council for the foreign department. In this capacity he accompanied Lord Hardinge to the Panjab and drew up an admirable memoir on its resources. As foreign secretary he also visited the western frontier with Lord Dalhousie, on the occasion of the Sikh War, and negotiated the treaty with the Sikh chiefs relative to the settlement of the Panjab and Gujarat, and received the KCB for his services (1849). Throughout his official career he had devoted his leisure to study.

Early on, he conducted a magazine at Mirat which contained many valuable articles on Indian subjects. With a view to assisting the projected official 'Glossary of Indian Judicial and Revenue Terms,' he published in 1845 at Agra his 'Supplement to the Glossary,' described by Professor H. H. Wilson as 'replete with curious and valuable information, especially as regards the tribes and clans of Brahmans and Rajputs.' A second edition appeared in 1860. His chief work, however, was the 'Bibliographical Index to the Historians of Mohammadan India,' in which he proposed to give an analysis of the contents and a criticism of the value of 231 Arabic and Persian historians of India, but of which he only lived to publish the first volume (Calcutta and London, 1849).

Elliot was married to the daughter of William Cowell a judge at the Provincial Court of Appeal, at Bareilly, Bengal, India. Failing health compelled him to seek a change of climate, and he died on 20 December 1853 on his way home at Simon's Town, Cape of Good Hope, aged 45.

Children of Sir Henry Miers Elliot KCB & Eliza Rebecca Cowell

1. Eliza Amelia Elliot b. 19 Jan 1830
2. Henry Lettsom Elliott b. 4 Jul 1831
3. Fredrick Elrington Elliot b. 12 Apr 1836
4. Richard James Elliot b. 17 Dec 1840

== Legacy ==
His memorial exists at St. Paul's Cathedral, Kolkata. There is a still-functioning Elliot club, now owned by the Government of Haryana at Hisar, founded by him for then East India Company officials, and O.P. Jindal Gyan Kendra knowledge currently stands on its land.

Elliot left behind him manuscript collections which were placed in the hands of competent scholars for publication. His historical researches bore fruit in The History of India, as Told by Its Own Historians. The Muhammadan Period, edited by John Dowson, 8 vols. 1866–1877, with a 'Sequel,' edited by Sir Edward Clive Bayley, 1886. His Memoirs of the History, Folklore, and Distribution of the Races of the North-West Provinces also found an editor in John Beames, 2 vols. 1869.

== Works ==
The Sudder Board of Revenue of North-Western Provinces encouraged him to publish a glossary on terms in use throughout the region. The work included terms little covered and was heavily based on Siraj-ud-Din Ali Khan Arzu's work Nawādir al-Alfāz. He completed the first volume of the work titled Supplement to the Glossary of Indian Terms, covering the alphabet from A to J. However, Elliot died before completing the second volume. A second edition was published in 1869 after being significantly enlarged and revised by John Beames. The edition was titled Memoirs on the History, Folk-lore, and Distribution of the Races of the North Western Provinces of India: Being an Amplified Edition of the Original Supplemental Glossary of Indian Terms.

Elliot's life-work, the Mohammedan historians of India, came out mostly in two well-known works. The first one was titled Bibliographical Index to the Historians of Muhammedan India and its first and only volume was published at Calcutta in 1849. His manuscripts were edited posthumously by John Dowson and published in The History of India as Told by Its Own Historians. A much lesser-known work titled, Appendix to the Arabs in Sind, Vol.III, Part 1, of the Historians of India was written when he was on his deathbed and wrote it to apparently test the powers of his mind which he had doubted.

- Elliot, Henry Miers (1845). Supplemental Glossary of Indian Terms: A-J. Printed at the Secundra Orphan Press by N.H. Longden.
- Elliot, Henry Miers (1849). Bibliographical Index to the Historians of Muhammedan India. Vol. I (General Histories). Calcutta: Baptist Mission Press.
- Elliot, Henry Miers (1853). Appendix to the Arabs in Sind, Vol. III, Part 1, of the Historians of India. Cape Town.
- The History of India as Told by Its Own Historians: The Muhammadan Period, The Posthumous Papers of the Late H. M. Elliot, edited by John Dowson; in 8 volumes (1867–77)
- Memoirs on the History, Folk-lore, and Distribution of the Races of the North Western Provinces of India: Being an Amplified Edition of the Original Supplemental Glossary of Indian Terms, edited by John Beames; in 2 volumes (1869)
- Elliot, Henry Miers (1875). Wakiʼat-i Jahangiri. Lahore: Sheikh Mubarak Ali.

== Sources ==
- This article incorporates text from a publication now in the public domain: Stephen, Leslie, ed. (1889). "Elliot, Henry Miers". Dictionary of National Biography. Vol. 17. London: Smith, Elder & Co.
