= Kheireddine Abdul Wahab =

Kheireddine Abdul Wahab (1878 – January 1944) was a Lebanese businessman and mayor of the city of El Mina, who played a pivotal role in the establishment of Lebanon's second largest harbor, at Tripoli, as well as founding the Piloting & Harboring company, which oversees present-day harbor activities.

== Biography ==
Abdul Wahab was born the son of a sailor in the northern city of El Mina, which was then known as Al-Askaleh, during Ottoman rule. Wahab received little schooling, and became a foreman on the El Mina docks, where merchant ships used smaller, local boats to onload and offload cargo. This was a lengthy, and labor-intensive process, and Abdul Wahab, with the help of his brother Adel, and enjoying the advantage of having a large family, the Abdul Wahabs, came to dominate the El Mina harbour labour force during the first decade of the 20th century, seeing Kheireddine himself become the owner of the small loading boats, leveraging his labour advantage.

In 1914, with World War I imminent, the importance of vital harbors became apparent. Kheireddine enjoyed good relations with the Ottomans at the time, and with political backing was the first, and to this day, the only man who leased one of Lebanon's islands, Cows island (today known as Abdul Wahab Island), as his ship construction site. This was the beginning of a long history of shipping, that extended between Cairo and Aleppo, branching out into commercial transport, import and export, in addition to the piloting and harboring business in El Mina.

By the end of the war and the inception of the French Mandate on Lebanon, Abdul Wahab had switched camps, and had helped Allied forces during the war through using his shipping business and in his status as a respected figure in the region. Among other tasks, he served as a proxy to assist the Allies in smuggling arms, ammunition and food behind enemy lines.

With the end of war in 1918, the French mandate modernized many outlets in Lebanon, one of which was the construction of the "Grumpk" key, as well as deepening the waters and the construction of a modern harbor in Tripoli, Lebanon, that still stands today. The project was contracted to a French corporation, which in turn subcontracted it to the local businesses, including Abdul Wahab's. The mandate then issued him the exclusive right of providing piloting, harboring, and fresh water supply services within Tripoli harbor waters.

The French mandate appointed Kheireddine Abdul Wahab as mayor of the newly established city of Al-Askaleh, a position which he held for 20 years until his death. In his later years, and after forming the Kheireddine and Adel Abdul Wahab Holding company, which at one point was a major owner of Al-Askaleh business and real estate, Abdul Wahab retired and took to philanthropy until his death in January 1944.

== See also ==
- El Mina, Lebanon
