= History of Tripoli, Lebanon =

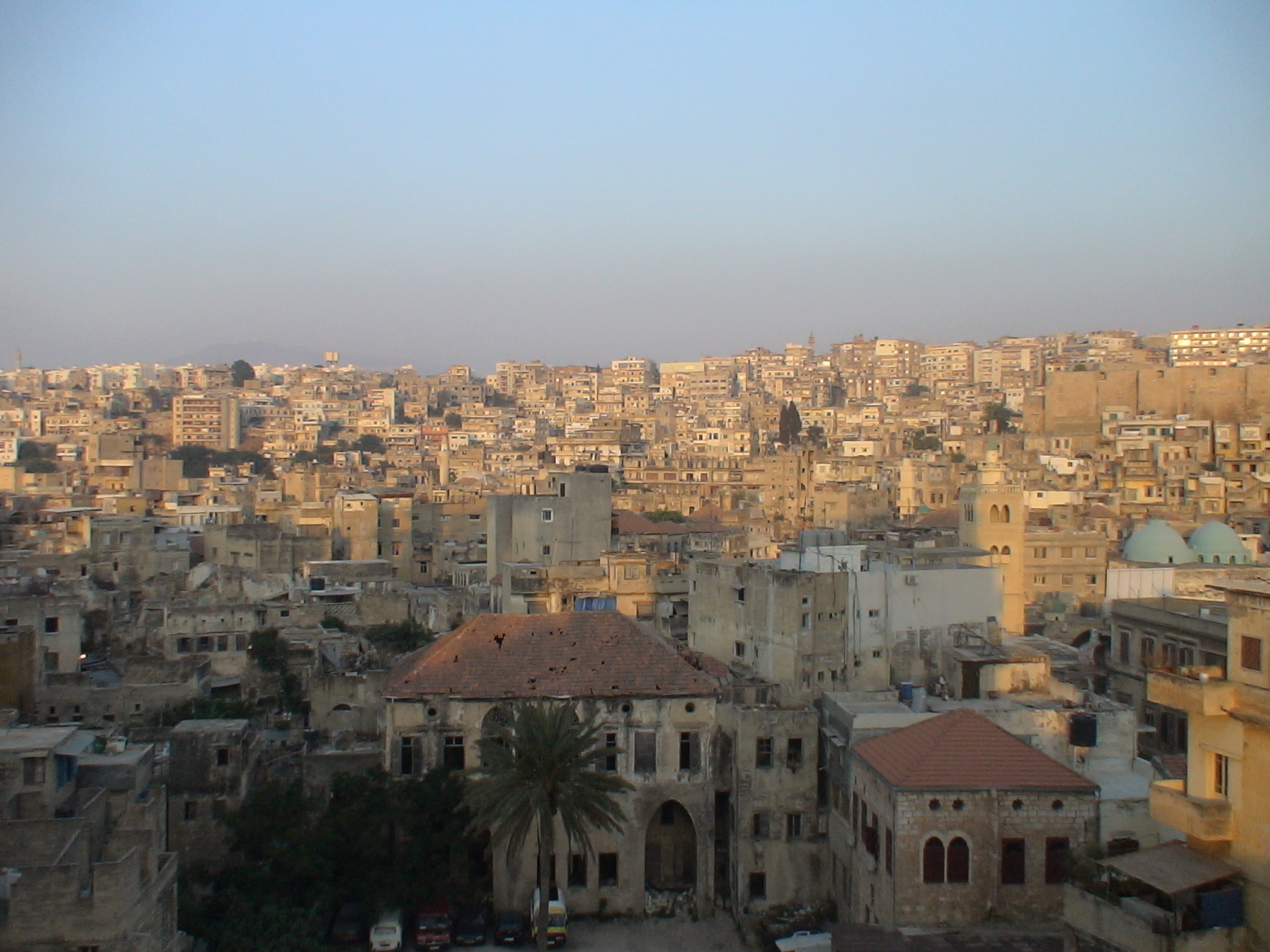
Overview of historical districts in Tripoli

Evidence of settlement in Tripoli dates back as early as 1400 BCE. Tripoli was originally a Phoenician colony. In the 9th century, the Phoenicians established a trading station in Tripoli and later, under Persian rule, the city became the center of a confederation of the Phoenician city-states of Sidon, Tyre, and Arados Island. Under Hellenistic rule, Tripoli was used as a naval shipyard and the city enjoyed a period of autonomy. It came under Roman rule around 64 BCE. The 551 Beirut earthquake and tsunami destroyed the Byzantine city of Tripoli along with other Mediterranean coastal cities.

During Umayyad rule, Tripoli became a commercial and shipbuilding center. It achieved semi-independence under Fatimid rule, when it developed into a center of learning. The Crusaders laid siege to the city at the beginning of the 12th century and were able finally to enter it in 1109. This caused extensive destruction, including the burning of Tripoli's famous library, Dar al-'Ilm (House of Knowledge), with its thousands of volumes. During the Crusaders' rule the city became the capital of the County of Tripoli. In 1289, it fell to the Mamluks and the old port part of the city was destroyed. A new inland city was then built near the old castle. During Ottoman rule from 1516 to 1918, it retained its prosperity and commercial importance. Tripoli and all of Lebanon was under French mandate from 1920 until 1943 when Lebanon achieved independence.

== Ancient period ==
Many historians reject the presence of any Phoenician civilization in Tripoli before the 8th (or sometimes 4th) century BCE. Others argue that the north–south gradient of Phoenician port establishments on the Lebanese coast indicates an earlier age for the Phoenician Tripoli.

Tripoli has not been extensively excavated because the ancient site lies buried beneath the modern city of El Mina. However, a few accidental finds are now in museums. Excavations in El Mina revealed skeletal remains of ancient wolves, eels, and gazelles, part of the ancient southern port quay, grinding mills, different types of columns, wheels, Bows, and a necropolis from the end of the Hellenistic period. A sounding made in the Crusader castle uncovered Late Bronze Age, Iron Age, in addition to Roman, Byzantine, and Fatimid remains. At the Abou Halka area (at the southern entrance of Tripoli) refuges dating to the early (30,000 years old) and middle Stone Age were uncovered.

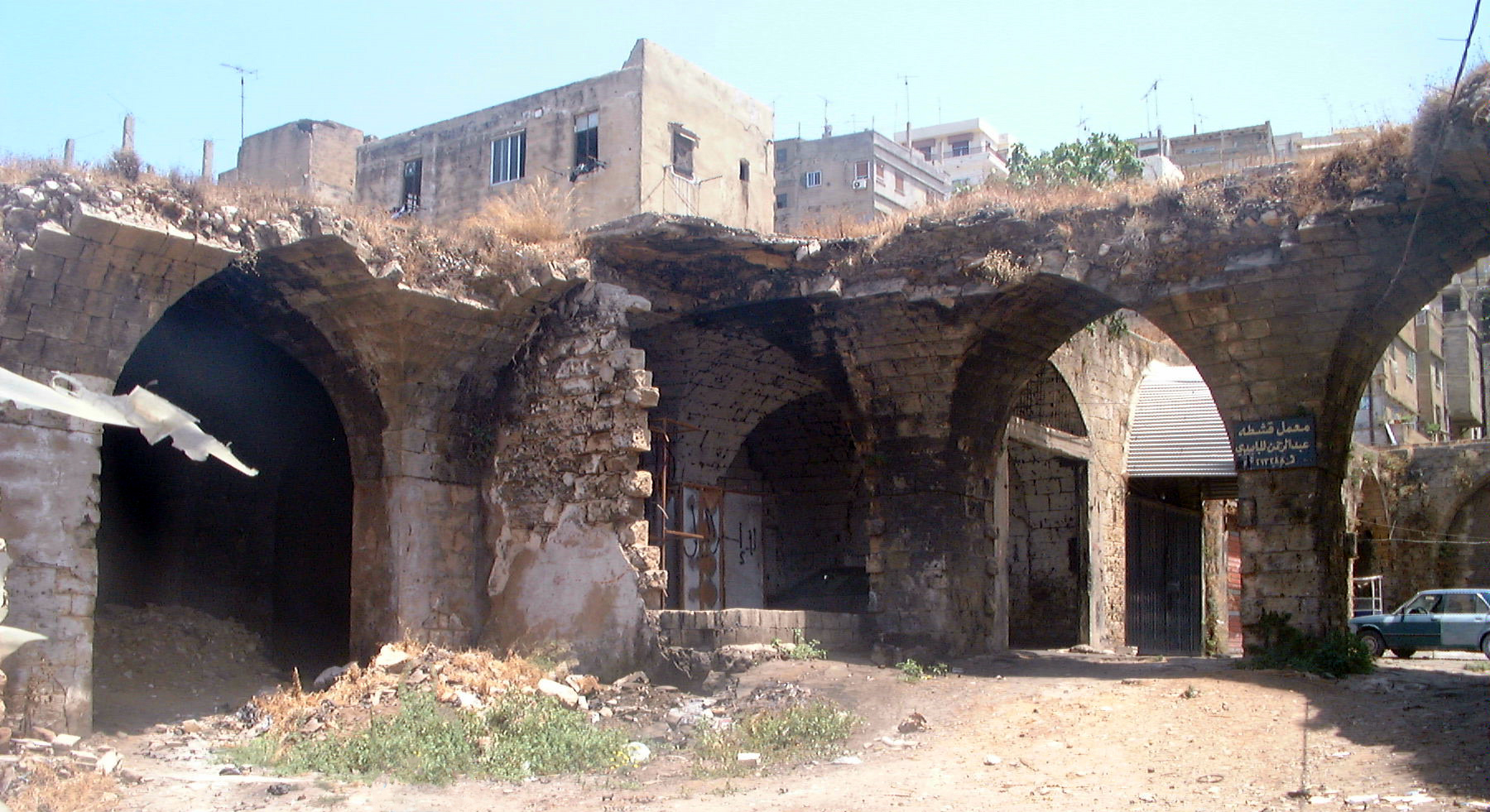
Ruins in Tripoli

Tripoli became a financial center and main port of northern Phoenicia with sea trade (East Mediterranean and the West), and caravan trade (North Syria and hinterland).

== Seleucid Empire ==
Under the Seleucids, Tripoli gained the right to mint its own coins (112 BCE) which were minted in silver and bronze; it was granted autonomy between 104 and 105, which it retained until 64 BCE. At the time, Tripoli was a center of shipbuilding and cedar timber trade (like other Phoenician cities).

== Roman period ==
During the Roman and Byzantine period, Tripoli witnessed the construction of important public buildings including municipal stadium or gymnasium due to strategic position of the city midway on the imperial coastal highway leading from Antioch to Ptolemais. In addition, Tripoli retained the same configuration of three distinct and administratively independent quarters (Aradians, Sidonians, and Tyrians). The territory outside the city was divided between the three quarters.

During the late 3rd Century, Tripolis was the site of a Roman mint from around 270 to 286.

In 488, Severus of Antioch is baptised at the Church of Saint Leontius at Tripolis (modern-day Tripoli) with Evagrius as his sponsor.

== Rashidun era ==
Tripoli was conquered for the first time in a separate conquest by the commander Yuqna in the year 18 AH (639/640 AD), then the Byzantine Empire reoccupied some of its coast at the end of the Caliphate of Umar Ibn Al-Khattab or the beginning of the caliphate of Uthman Ibn Affan. When Uthman appointed Muawiyah over the Levant, Muawiyah sent Sufyan bin Mujib al-Azdi to Tripoli to restore it, and it was three cities combined, so he built in Al-Marj ("the meadow"), miles from it, a fortress called "Sufyan's fort", and he used to stay in his fortress every night and fortify the Muslims there, then go to the enemy in the morning. He besieged Tripoli and cut off the supply of its people from the sea and land. Ibn Asaker adds in his “History of Damascus” details that confirm the story, which he transmitted with his chain of transmission on the authority of Abu Muti’ Mu’awiyah bin Yahya al-Tarabulsi (Note: Al-Tarābulsi meaning "The Tripolitan") (died after 170 AH, 786/787 AD) on the authority of a Sheikh from Tripoli that Sufyan bin Mujib camped with his great army in Marj al-Silsilah (Beddawi), which is five miles from Tripoli. At the origin of Mount Terbol, he used to walk to Tripoli to besiege it and then return to his camp in Al-Beddawi, and he continued on that for months until Muawiyah wrote to him ordering him to build for him and his companions a fortress that would shelter him by night and besiege them by day. As a result, Sufyan built a fortress two miles from Tripoli, which is called “Sufyan’s Fort.”

On the basis of this historical text of Abu Al-Muti’ al-Tarabulsi, the historian Omar Tadmouri said that the Sufyan fortress is now located at the now-known Tripoli Citadel. The castle is two miles away from old Tripoli (El Mina), or 3200 meters. When the siege intensified upon them, they gathered in one of the city's fortresses and wrote to the Roman king Constans II asking him to supply them or to send them boats to escape to. Subsequently, the emperor sent numerous boats to them, so they boarded them at night and fled. When Sufyan became aware, he found the fortress in which they were empty, so he entered it, and wrote the news of the conquest to Muawiyah. Then Abd al-Malik re-built it afterwards and fortified it (in modern El Mina).

== Umayyad, Abbasid and Fatimid periods ==
Tripoli gained in importance as a trading centre for the whole Mediterranean after it was inhabited by the Arabs. Tripoli was the port city of Damascus; the second military port of the Arab Navy, following Alexandria; a prosperous commercial and shipbuilding center; a wealthy principality under the Kutama Ismaili Shia Banu Ammar emirs. Legally, Tripoli was part of the jurisdiction of the military province of Damascus (Jund Dimashq).

=== Abbasid era ===
The Byzantines took advantage of the political changes resulted by the Abbasid revolution, by attacking the Islamic regions and occupying Tripoli in 141 AH (758/759 AD) from its governor, Rabāh bin al-Nu’mān, with Bekaa getting attacked by the rebel Elias in the year 137 AH (754/755 AD) and the Munaytirah revolt took place in 141 AH. And when events escalated, it became imperative for the Abbasid Caliph to fight back with combat to defend the Caliphate. He mobilized the frontiers with fighters to protect them. He assigned the Tanukhid tribes to head to the mountains of Beirut to protect the coasts of the Levant and Islamic possessions from the Byzantine danger and local hostile movements.

=== Revolt of Tripoli ===
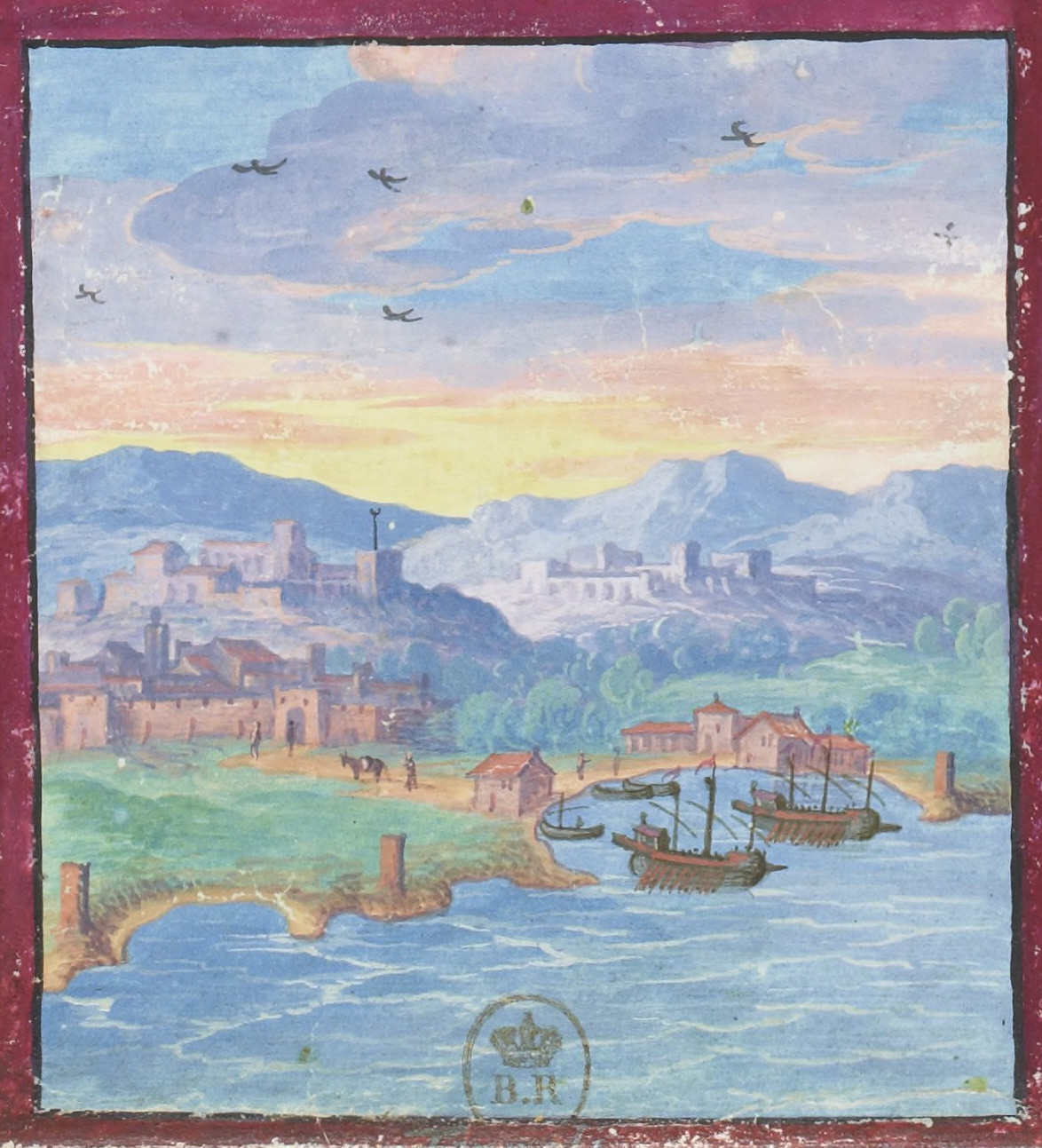
A painting dating back to 1578 AD of the city of Tripoli, Lebanon, whose people revolted against the Ikhshidids due to the governor's tyranny.

In Tripoli, 357 AH corresponding to the year 968 AD, there was a revolution against the Turkic Abbasid-appointed Ikhshidid rulers as a result of the tyranny of the governor, Abu al-Hasan Ahmed bin Ghurair al-Arghli, and his injustice and cruelty in the treatment of the people. It is known that Tripoli was affiliated at the time to the Wilayat of Damascus, and that the Damascene wali is the one who appoints the governor of Tripoli. The people expelled the ruler from the city, so he settled in the fortress of Arqa and fortified it, and the residents of Tripoli became without a ruler or an Amir. And in the meantime, the Byzantine Emperor Nikephoros Phocas II arrived in Tripoli in his campaign on the Levant in an attempt to take it from the Muslims, where he had seized the north of the country, including Arqa. Where he arrested Abu Al-Hassan bin Ghurair Al-Arghli and took all his money, then he went to Tripoli and went down to it on the day of Eid Al-Adha and stayed in it that night and burned its territory and returned to the coastal countries.

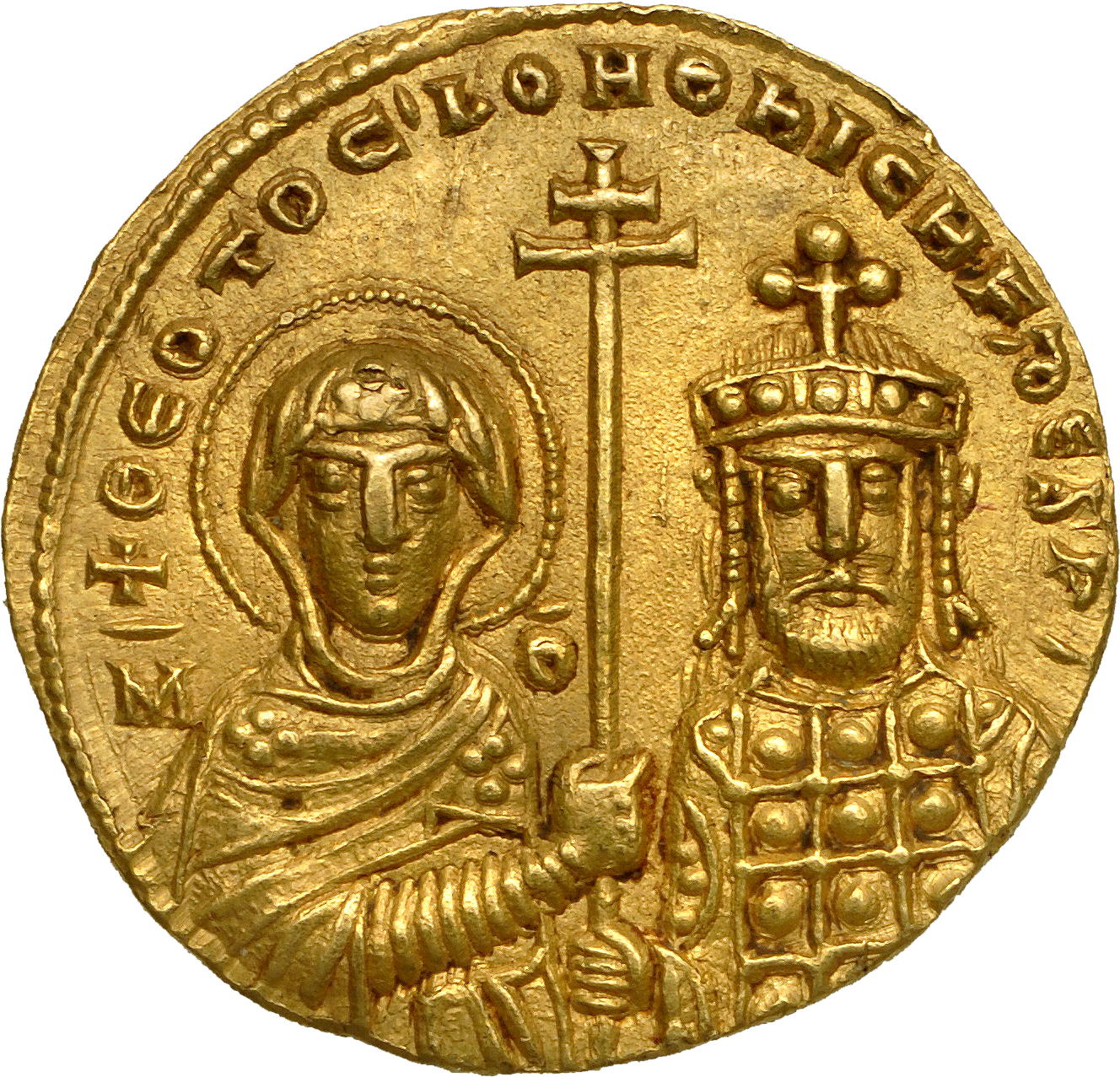
Histamenon of Nikephoros II (right) alongside Mother Mary, 963-969 AD.

=== Fatimid era ===
After the year 969 AD, the Fatimid state in Egypt succeeded the Ikhshidid state and extended its rule over Lebanon. In 975, the forces of the Byzantine emperor Tzimiskes took Tripoli from the forces of the Turkic anti-Fatimid military general Aftakin. The Byzantine general Bardas Phocas left Homs in the direction of the Beqaa to reach and invade Tripoli in 983 AD. In 996 and 997 AD the military forces of the Byzantine general Dalassenos raided the environs of Tripoli, and in December of 999, the Byzantine emperor Basil II also led a failed siege against Tripoli in the same month.

Among the most prominent industries of the Fatimids that spread in Lebanon was the manufacture of brocade clothes and the manufacture of the Tunfusah (طُنْفُسَةٌ). The city of Tripoli was famous for making paper for writing. The ports of the Lebanese coast were a popular market for all agricultural and industrial products, as well as a center for their export to the cities of the Mediterranean Basin.

=== 11th century Tripoli ===
During a visit by the traveler Nasir-i-Khusrau in 1047, he estimated the size of the population in Tripoli to be around 20,000 and the whole population were Shia Muslims. And according to Nasir Khusraw, the Fatimid Sultan raised a mighty army from Tripoli to defend it against Byzantine, Frankish, Andalusian and Moroccan invasions and raids.

Tripoli was ruled by qadis that were appointed by the Fatimids from Cairo until the death of the qadi Mukhtar al-Dawla ibn Bazzal around 1170. Then Amin al-Dawla Abu Talib al-Hasan ibn Ammar from the Banu Ammar family became qadi and declared the town independent. The Banu Ammar ruled the city until 1109. Under Amin al-Dawla the city remained a commercial center and became an intellectual center of Shiism having a library of 100,000 volumes. After Amin al-Dawla's death in 1072 his nephew Jalal al-Mulk Ali ibn Muhammad succeeded him until his death in 1099 when he was succeeded by his brother Fakhr al-Mulk. Under Fakhr al-Mulk Frankish troops of the First Crusade under Raymond de Saint-Gilles started the siege of Tripoli in 495 AH (1101/1102 CE). In 501 AH (1107/1108 CE) al-Mulk left Tripoli for Damascus and Baghdad to ask the Sunni rulers there for help against the crusaders.

== Crusader period ==
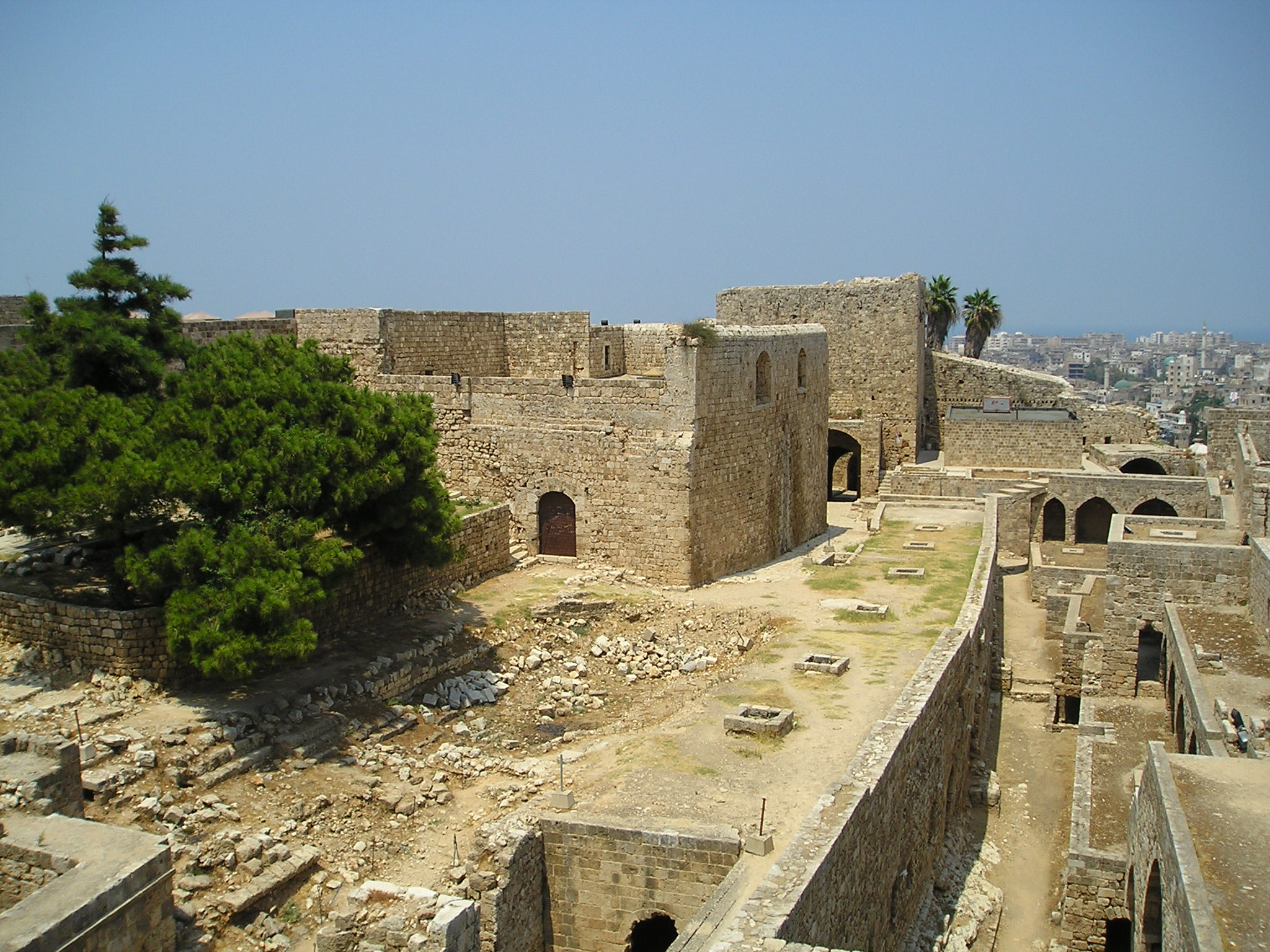
Citadel of Raymond de Saint-Gilles

After the siege of Tripoli, that lasted from 1102 until July 12, 1109, the city became the chief town of the County of Tripoli (Latin Crusader state of the Levant) extending from Byblos to Latakia and including the plain of Akkar with the famous Krak des Chevaliers. Tripoli was also the seat of a bishopric. Tripoli was home to a busy port and was a major center of silk weaving, with as many as 4,000 looms. Important products of the time included lemons, oranges, and sugar cane. For 180 years, during the Frankish rule, Occitan was among the languages spoken in Tripoli and neighboring villages. At that time, Tripoli had a heterogeneous population including Western Europeans, Greeks, Armenians, Maronites, Nestorians, Jews, and Muslims. During the Crusade period, Tripoli witnessed the growth of the inland settlement surrounding the "Pilgrim's Mountain" (the citadel) into a built-up suburb including the main religious monuments of the city such as: The "Church of the Holy Sepulchre of Pilgrim's Mountain" (incorporating the Shiite shrine), the Church of Saint Mary's of the Tower, and the Carmelite Church. The state was a major base of operations for the military order of the Knights Hospitaller, who occupied the famous castle Krak Des Chevaliers (today a UNESCO world heritage site). In the 1271 siege of Tripoli the Mamluk sultan Baybars unsuccessfully tried to capture the city. The state ceased to exist in 1289, when it was captured by the Egyptian Mamluk sultan Qalawun in the Fall of Tripoli.

== Mamluk period ==
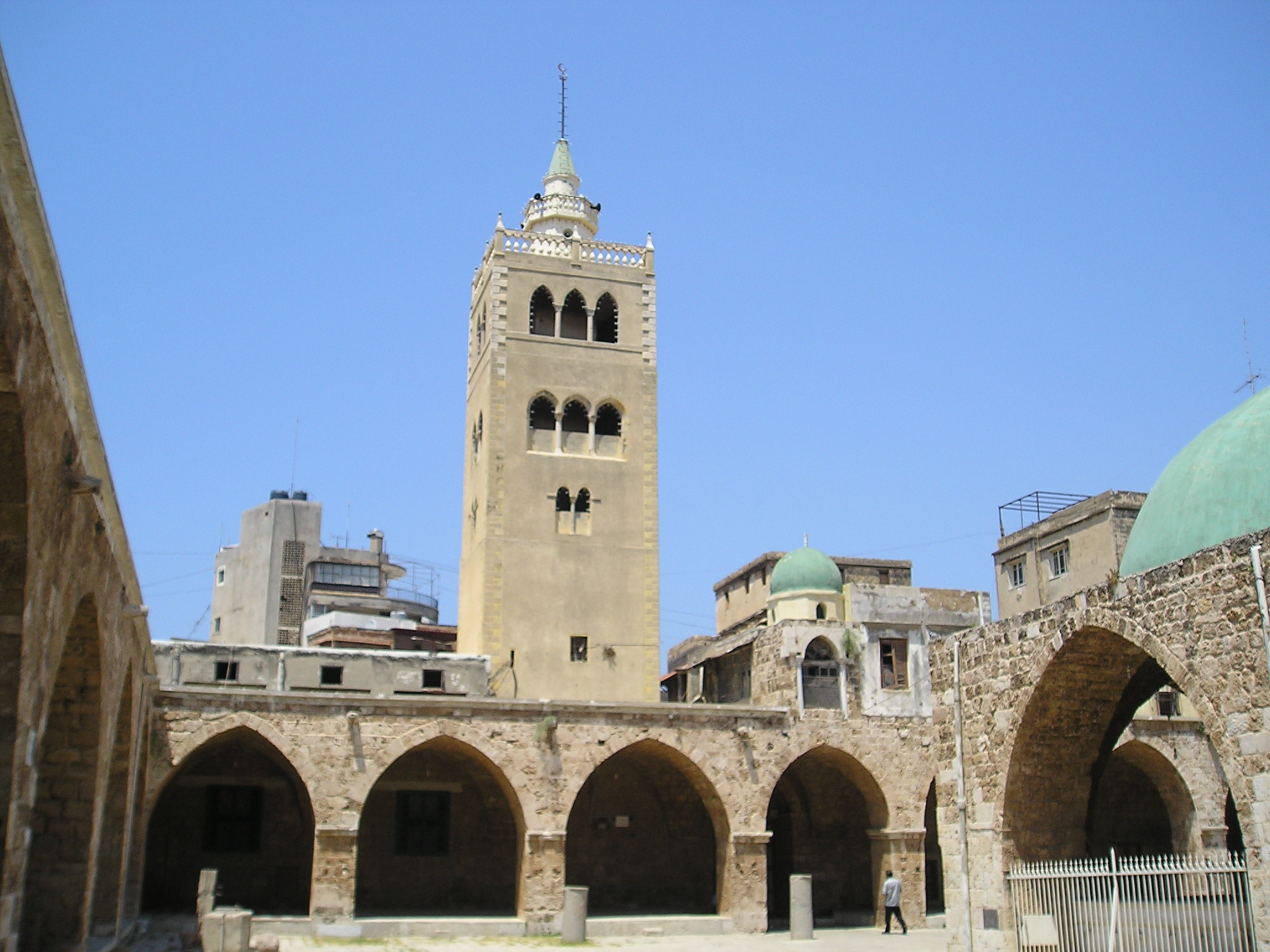
The Mansouri Great Mosque (late 13th century). The arches and courtyard date from the Mamluk period but the minaret is probably from a crusaders' church.

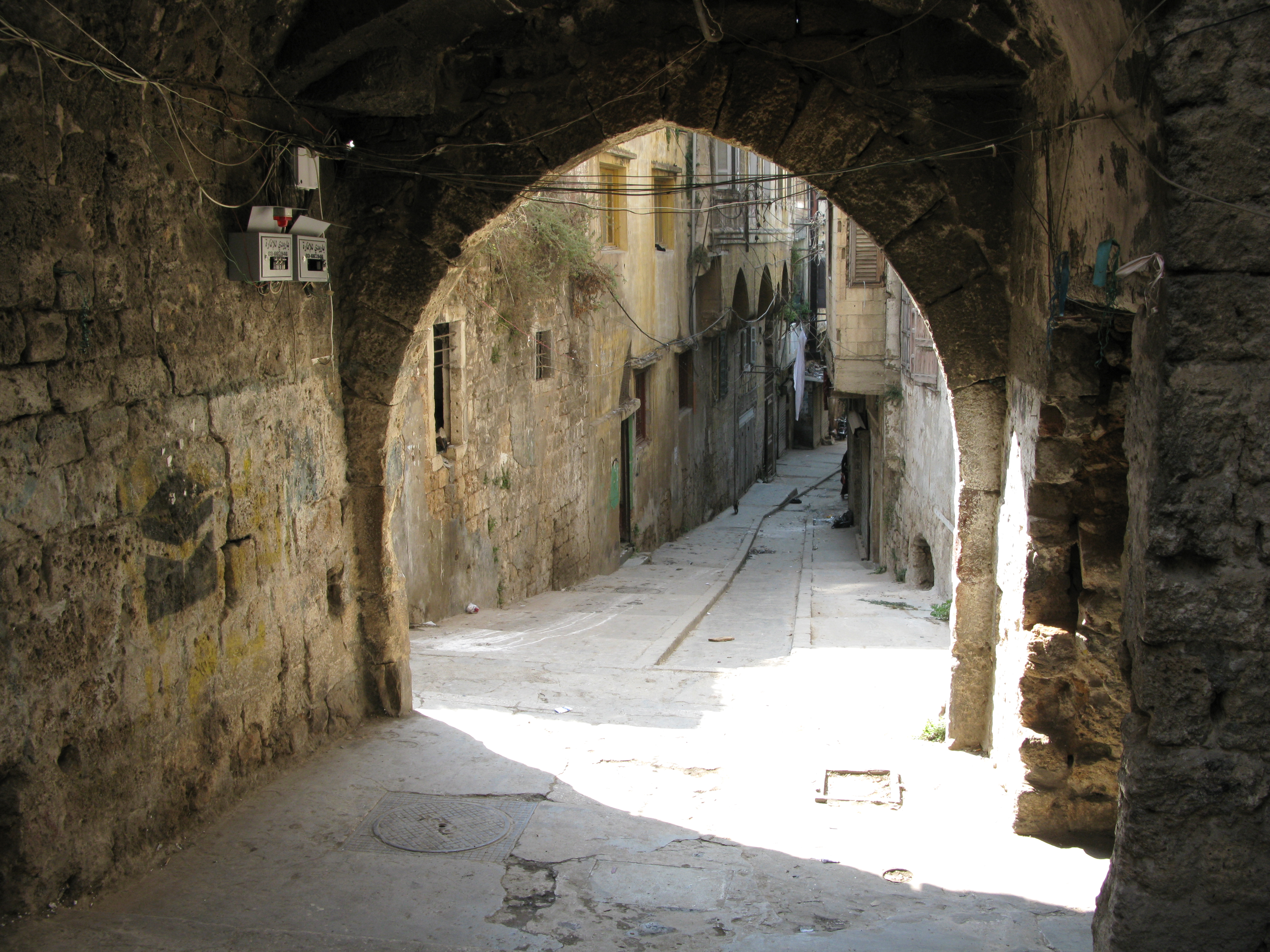
Downtown historical Tripoli

Tripoli was captured by Sultan al-Mansur Qalawun from the Crusaders in 1289. The Mamluks destroyed the old city and built a new city 4 km inland from it. About 35 monuments from the Mamluk city have survived to the present day, including mosques, madrasas, khanqahs, hammams (bathhouses), and caravanserais, many of them built by local Mamluk amirs (princes). The Mamluks did not fortify the city with walls but restored and reused the Crusader Citadel of Raymond de Saint-Gilles on site.

During the Mamluk period, Tripoli became a central city and provincial capital of the six kingdoms in Mamluk Syria. Tripoli ranked third after Aleppo and Safad. The kingdom was subdivided into six wilayahs or provinces and extended from Byblos and Aqra mountains south, to Latakia and al Alawiyyin mountains north. It also included Hermel, the plain of Akkar, and Hosn al-Akrad (Krak des Chevaliers).

Tripoli became a major trading port of Syria supplying Europe with candy, loaf and powdered sugar (especially during the latter part of the 14th century). The main products from agriculture and small industry included citrus fruits, olive oil, soap, and textiles (cotton and silk, especially velvet).

The Mamluks formed the ruling class holding main political, military and administrative functions. Arabs formed the population base (religious, industrial, and commercial functions) and the general population included the original inhabitants of the city, immigrants from different parts of Syria, North Africans who accompanied Qalawun's army during the liberation of Tripoli, Eastern Orthodox Christians, some Western families, and a minority of Jews. The population size of Mamluk Tripoli is estimated at 20,000–40,000; against 100,000 in each of Damascus and Aleppo.

Mamluk Tripoli witnessed a high rate of urban growth and a fast city development (according to traveler's accounts). It also had poles of growth including the fortress, the Great Mosque, and the river banks. The city had seven guard towers on the harbor site to defend the inland city, including what still stands today as the Lion Tower. During the period the castle of Saint Gilles was expanded as the Citadel of Mamluk Tripoli. The "Aqueduct of the Prince" was reused to bring water from the Rash'in spring. Several bridges were constructed and the surrounding orchards expanded through marsh drainage. Fresh water was supplied to houses from their roofs.

The urban form of Mamluk Tripoli was dictated mainly by climate, site configuration, defense, and urban aesthetics. The layout of major thoroughfares was set according to prevailing winds and topography. The city had no fortifications, but heavy building construction characterized by compact urban forms, narrow and winding streets for difficult city penetration. Residential areas were bridged over streets at strategic points for surveillance and defense. The city also included many loopholes and narrow slits at street junctions.

The religious and secular buildings of Mamluk Tripoli comprise a fine example of the architecture of that time. The oldest among them were built with stones taken from 12th and 13th-century churches; the characteristics of the architecture of the period are best seen in the mosques and madrassas, the Islamic schools. It is the madrassas which most attract attention, for they include highly original structures as well as decoration: here a honeycombed ceiling, there a curiously shaped corniche, doorway or moulded window frame. Among the finest is the madrassa al-Burtasiyah, with an elegant façade picked out in black and white stones and a highly decorated lintel over the main door.

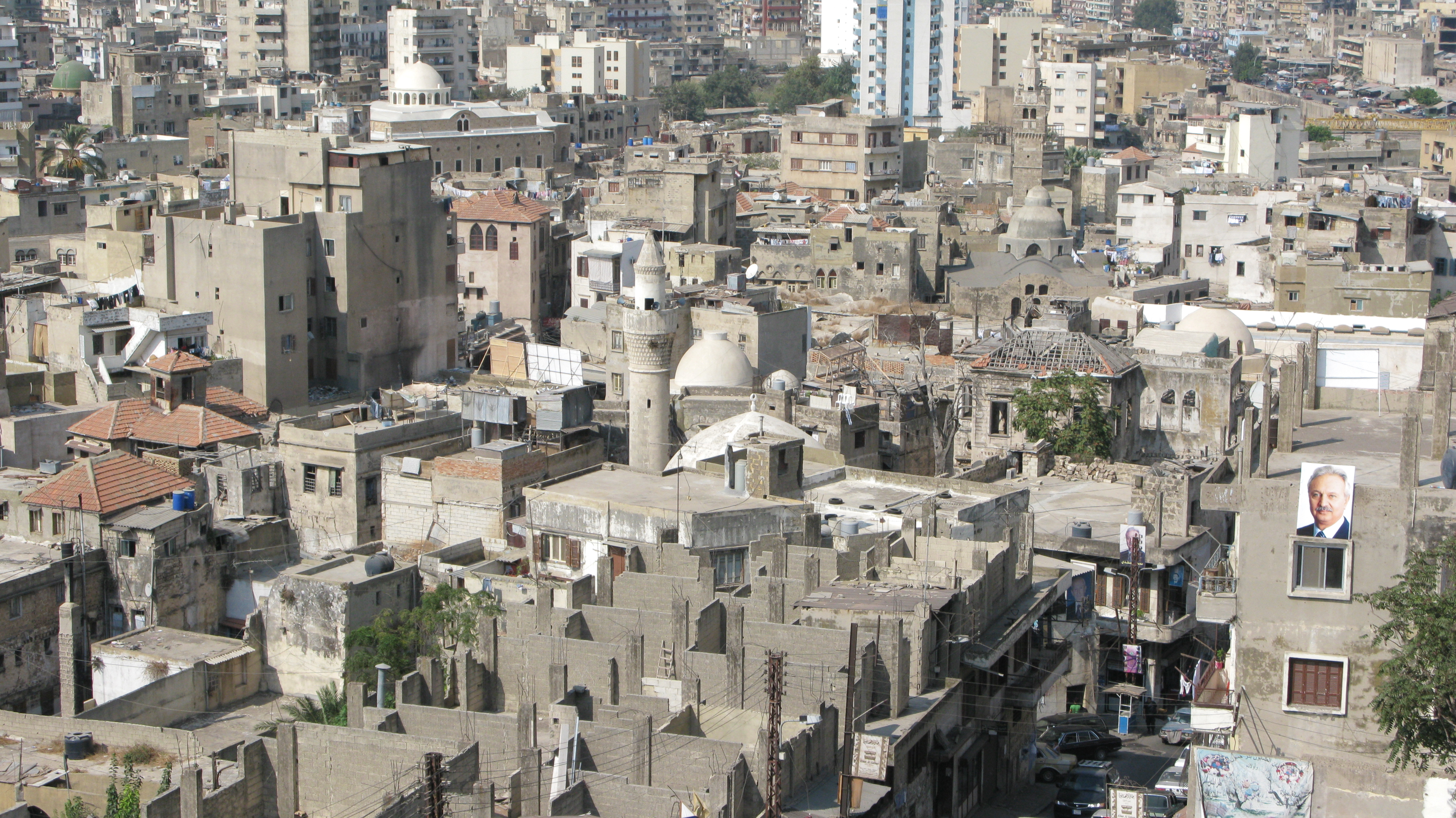
East Tripoli

Public buildings in Mamluk Tripoli were emphasized through sitting, façade treatment, and street alignment. Well-cut and well-dressed stones (local sandstone) were used as media of construction and for decorative effects on elevations and around openings (the ablaq technique of alternating light and dark stone courses). Bearing walls were used as vertical supports. Cross vaults covered most spaces from prayer halls to closed rectangular rooms, to galleries around courtyards. Domes were constructed over conspicuous and important spaces like tomb chambers, mihrab, and covered courtyards. Typical construction details in Mamluk Tripoli included cross vaults with concave grooves meeting in octagonal openings or concave rosettes as well as simple cupolas or ribbed domes. The use of double drums and corner squinches was commonly used to make the transition from square rooms to round domes.

Decorations in Mamluk buildings concentrated on the most conspicuous areas of buildings: minarets, portals, windows, on the outside, and mihrab, qiblah wall, and floor on the inside. Decorations at the time may be subdivided into structural decoration (found outside the buildings and incorporate the medium of construction itself such as ablaq walls, plain or zigzag moldings, fish scale motifs, joggled lintels or voussoirs, inscriptions, and muqarnas) and applied decoration (found inside the buildings and include the use of marble marquetry, stucco, and glass mosaic).

Mosques evenly spread with major concentration of madrasas around the Mansouri Great Mosque. All khans were located in the northern part of the city for easy accessibility from roads to Syria. Hammams were carefully located to serve major population concentrations: one next to the Grand Mosque, the other in the center of the commercial district, and the third in the right-bank settlement.

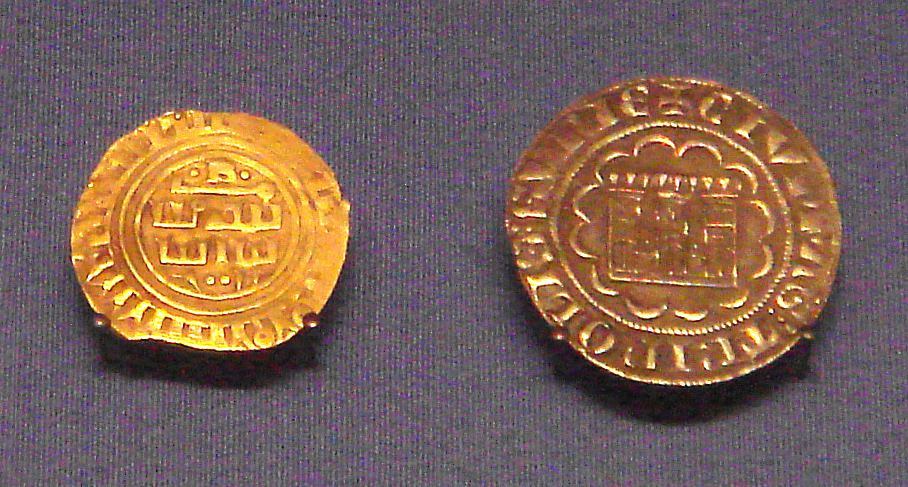
Tripoli gold bezant in Arabic (1270–1300), and Tripoli silver gros (1275–1287), British Museum

About 35 monuments from the Mamluk city have survived to the present day, including mosques, madrasas, khanqahs, hammams, and caravanserais, many of them built by local Mamluk amirs. Major buildings in Mamluk Tripoli included six congregational mosques (the Mansouri Great Mosque, al-Aattar, Taynal, al-Uwaysiyat, al-Burtasi, and al-Tawbat Mosques). Sultan al-Ashraf Khalil (r. 1290–93) founded the city's first congregational mosque in memory of his father (Qalawun), in either late 1293 or 1294 (693 AH). Six madrasas were later built around the mosque. The Mamluks did not fortify the city with walls but restored and reused a Crusader citadel on the site. In addition, there were two quarter mosques (Abd al-Wahed and Arghoun Shah), and two mosques that were built on empty land (al-Burtasi and al-Uwaysiyat). Other mosques incorporated earlier structures (churches, khans, and shops). Mamluk Tripoli also included 16 madrasas of which four no longer exist (al-Zurayqiyat, al-Aattar, al-Rifaiyah, and al-Umariyat). Six of the madrasas concentrated around the Grand Mosque. Tripoli also included a Khanqah, many secular buildings, five Khans, three hammams that are noted for their cupolas. Hammams were luxuriously decorated and the light streaming down from their domes enhances the inner atmosphere of the place.

== Ottoman period ==
Tripoli came under Ottoman sovereignty when the Turks defeated the Mamluks in the Battle of Marj Dabiq in 1516 AD. And they kept the system followed in appointing guarantors and representatives for a few years, until it became leased to the fiefs on whose behalf they were appointed to take over its rule, as of the year 1522 AD. Tripoli became the provincial capital and chief town of the Eyalet of Tripoli, encompassing the coastal territory from Byblos to Tarsus and the inland Syrian towns of Homs and Hama; the two other eyalets were Aleppo Eyalet, and Şam Eyalet.

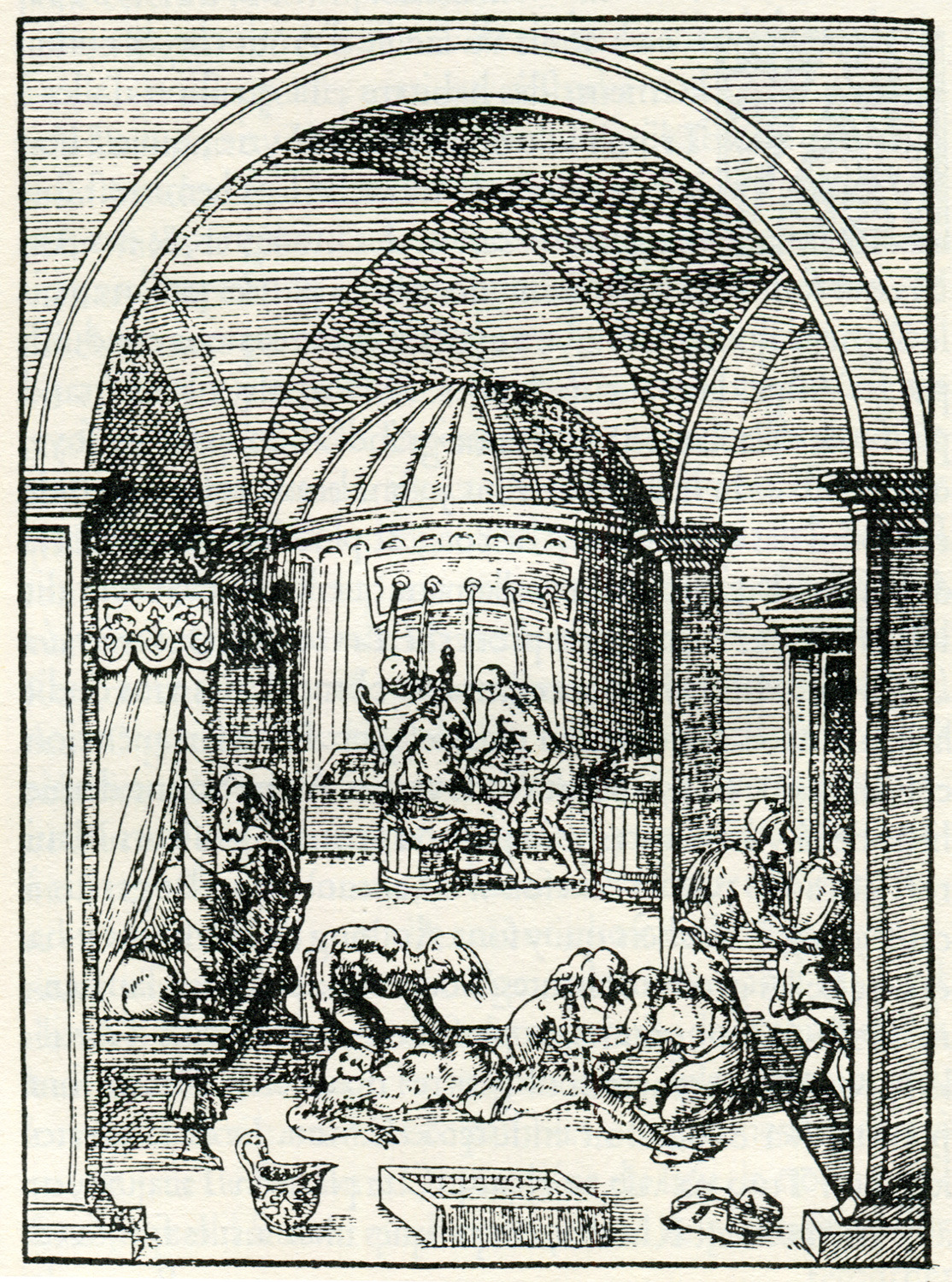
Public baths at Tripoli, Lebanon, 1556.

The Ottomans created several new residential areas that surrounded the Mamluk city which created a population boom, and the number of its mosques, madaris, Hammamat and khans increased substantially. Among the Ottoman landmarks established includes; Tekke dervish Mevlevi, Hammam al-Azem (the new), Mahmoud Bey al-Sanjak Mosque, Mahmoud Lutfi al-Zaim Mosque, Hamidi Mosque, Sabeel al-Basha, Minister Muhammad Pasha, Sabeel al-Zahid, Tekiyya al-Qadiriyya, and Sa’at al-Tal. The reign of the Turks in Tripoli is considered the longest Islamic era under its sovereignty, as their rule extended for about four and a half centuries, with the exception of eight years during which it was subjected to Egyptian rule when Ibrahim Pasha, son of Muhammad Ali al-Kabir, entered it in 1832.

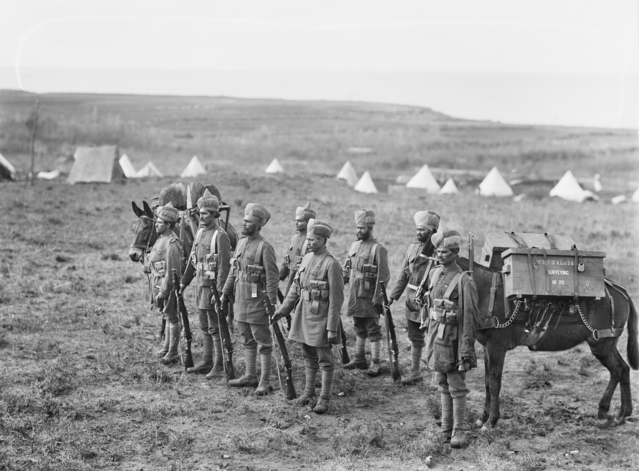
Indian Sappers and Miners in Tripoli, Lebanon, during World War I

Until 1612, Tripoli was considered as the port of Aleppo. It also depended on Syrian interior trade and tax collection from mountainous hinterland. Tripoli witnessed a strong presence of French merchants during the 17th and 18th centuries and became under intense inter-European competition for trade. Tripoli was reduced to a sanjak centre in the Vilayet of Beirut in 19th century and retained her status until 1918 when it was captured by British forces.

Public works in Ottoman Tripoli included the restoration of the Citadel of Tripoli by Suleiman I, the Magnificent. Later governors brought further modifications to the original Crusader structure used as garrison center and prison. Khan al-Saboun (originally a military barrack) was constructed in the center of the city to control any uprising. Ottoman Tripoli also witnessed the development of the southern entrance of the city and many buildings, such as the al-Muallaq or "hanging" Mosque (1559), al-Tahhan Mosque (early 17th century), and al-Tawbah mosque (Mamluk construction, destroyed by 1612 flood and restored during early Ottoman Period). It also included several secular buildings, such as Khan al-Saboun (early 17th century) and Hammam al-Jadid (1740).

== Modern Lebanon ==
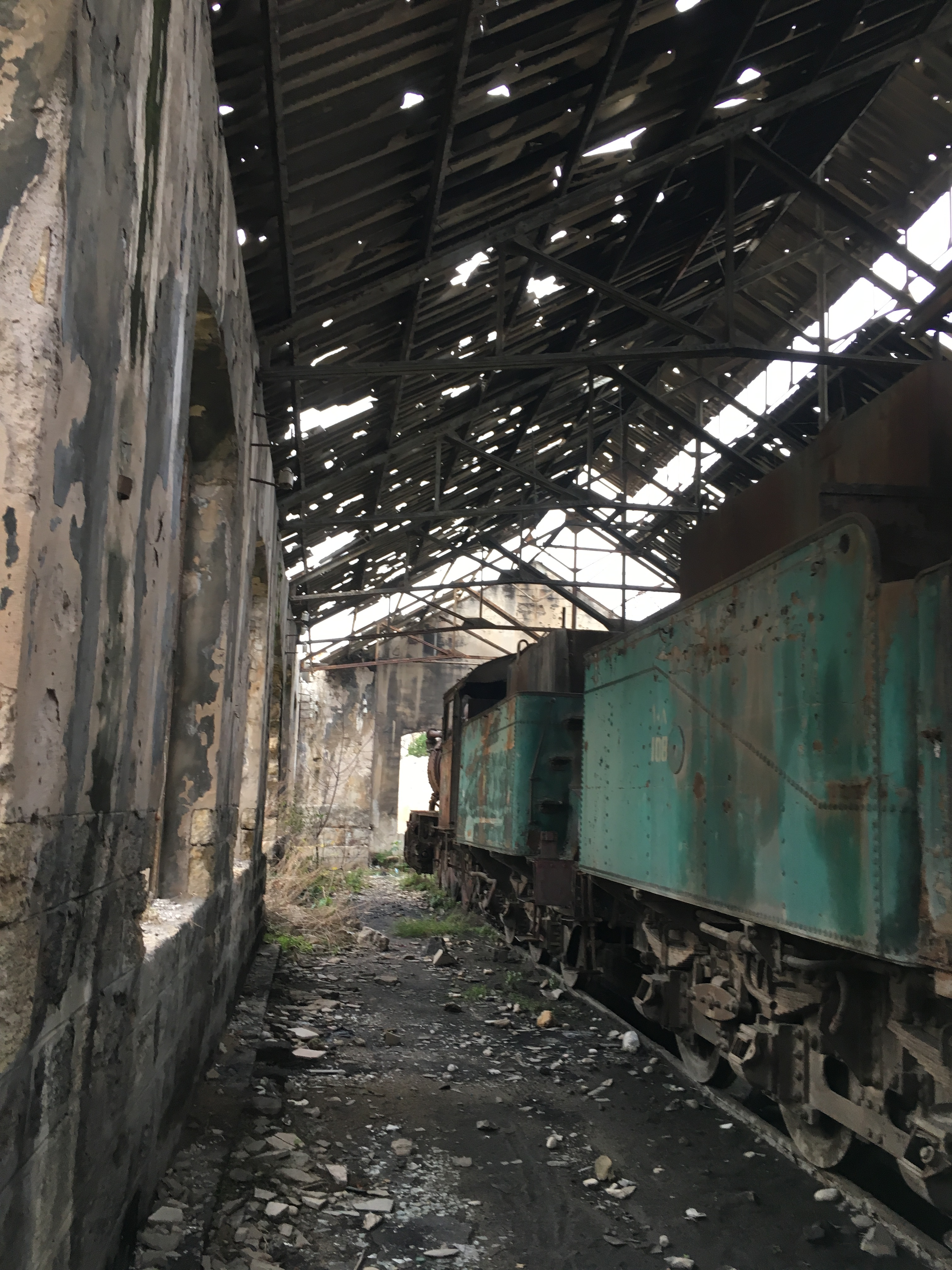
Rusted cars at the Tripoli railway station

Since the second half of the 19th century, during the decadence period of the Ottomans, Tripoli has been mired in a period of extended economic and political decline. Beirut's is detached from Damascus by an Ottoman decision, and rise as dominant port in the Levant competing with Tripoli as a trade hub. Until now Tripoli's inhabitants complaint against that decision and accuse Beirut and the Beirutians of being their source of decline ...

=== French era ===
On 13 November 1943, a tragic incident took place in Tripoli, resulting in the loss of lives of 14 students, all under the age of 15. The students were struck by French tanks driven by Senegalese soldiers while participating in a peaceful march through the streets. During the demonstration, the students were fervently advocating for an end to the occupation.

=== Lebanese civil war ===
==== Syrian intervention ====
On 31 May 1976, the Syrian army began an invasion of Lebanon. Two thousand troops and 60 tanks marched in three columns during a three-pronged offensive. The first column marched south across Shuf towards Sidon, where it was halted by PLO forces. The second column moved west along the Beirut - Damascus axis, before being stopped at Beirut. Another column moved north through the Bekaa valley, before then going west towards Tripoli, where it was stopped by Christian forces. The offensive had been halted by 10 June. A second Syrian offensive in mid-October 1976 succeeded at capturing all of central Lebanon as well as some of the country's most important urban centres.

==== PLO and the Battle of Tripoli ====
In early November, anti-PLO Palestinian factions and Syrian troops, reportedly backed by Libyan forces, started to assault PLO positions in the outskirts of Tripoli, most importantly Beddawi and Nahr al-Bared. The anti-Arafat militants accused the PLO of having started the fighting. The anti-Arafat forces included Said al-Muragha's followers, the PFLP, PFLP-GC, as-Sa'iqa, and the Palestine Liberation Army (PLA). Overall, the besiegers would include 10,000 Syrian soldiers and 6,000 Palestinian militants.

The initial clashes involved heavy weaponry, including artillery. While the ground war was raging, the propaganda war was also relentless. Arafat called upon other Islamic countries to assist the PLO to avoid "a new massacre", believing that international pressure would force Damascus to accept him as the legitimate leader and stop the fighting. However, Arab support for the PLO was mostly confined to statements of denunciation by Iraq towards the Syrian actions and Egypt sending an arms shipment to Arafat's forces. It was speculated that both the Israeli Navy as well as the Syrian Navy were deliberately allowing arms shipments to reach Arafat, as the former approved of the fighting among the PLO's factions, while Syria did not want to "act openly". The Soviet Union voiced its opposition to Syria's attacks against the PLO, but refrained from an intervention. The PLO also tried to mobilize grassroots support, for example calling on Alawites to speak out against Assad after Syrian special units opened fire on a demonstration in support of Arafat in Yarmouk camp.

The rebels captured Nahr al-Bared on 6 November. On 9 November, a ceasefire was agreed upon, while negotiations between the PLO, the anti-Arafat groups, and Syria were initiated under mediation by Kuwait, Saudi Arabia, Algeria, Lebanese third parties such as statesman Rashid Karami, and the Arab League. Fighting eventually resumed. By 16 November, the PLO had been mostly expelled from the two camps, though some Arafat loyalist pockets initially held out in Beddawi. The Syrian Armed Forces then surrounded Tripoli itself and initiated an artillery and aerial bombardment, displacing many civilians and destroying three ships in the harbor. The PLO responded in kind, countering with their own Katyusha rocket launchers, and mortars, deliberately hiding them amid residential areas. The artillery duel ultimately destroyed parts of Tripoli's port, its oil refinery, and central market. Arafat's followers began a counter-attack at Beddawi on 18 November; the operation lasted for three days, but produced few tangible results aside from widespread destruction due to heavy artillery fire.

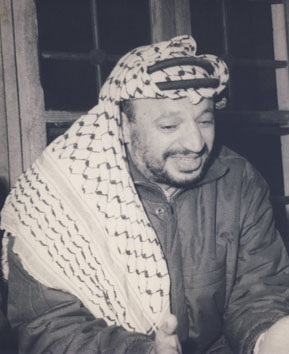
Yasser Arafat (1974)

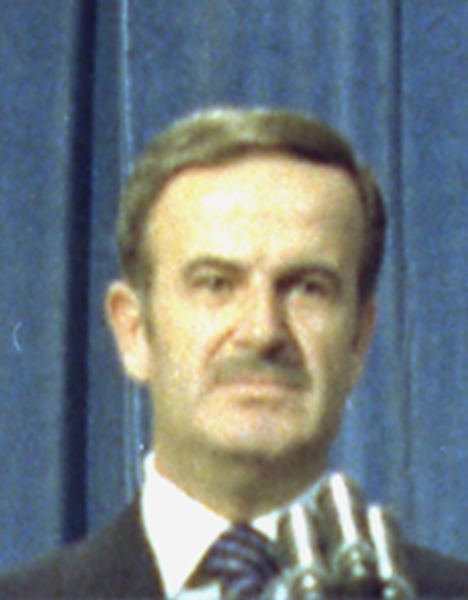
Hafez al-Assad (1977)

On 22 November, the Syrian-backed dissidents made major advances at the edges of Tripoli despite heavy resistance by the PLO loyalists, securing the Mallouleh intersection at the city's northern entrance and cutting all roads through the Baal Mohsen quarter which led to Beddawi. The last Arafat loyalists at the latter camp were thus cut off from aid. At this point, pro-Syrian Alawite militants also rose up within Tripoli, attacking Arafat's forces. Even though the PLO loyalists were increasingly cornered, IUM leader Said Shaaban urged Arafat to stay and keep fighting. In turn, Arafat declared that any withdrawal of his forces was conditioned on the Syrian-backed militants staying out of Tripoli and leaving his allies including the IUM alone. On 26 November, the Palestinian rebels decided to postpone a threatened attack, to give time to a Saudi-Syrian truce plan.

Faced with repeated attacks by the Syrians and allied Palestinians, coupled with the inaction of other countries, Arafat eventually yielded and agreed to a ceasefire as well as evacuation deal at the end of November. After obtaining promises from the United States and Arab countries that his forces would not be attacked on their retreat, the PLO agreed to leave Tripoli. The evacuation of his forces had to be delayed, however, as the Israeli Navy began to shell Tripoli. Arafat's forces agreed to leave their heavy weapons behind, including the Katyusha multiple rocket launchers, technicals, recoilless rifles, and antiaircraft guns. These were handed over to the Lebanese Army. About 4,700 PLO loyalists, including dozens of wounded, were evacuated by five Greek ships under protection of French Navy vessels, including the aircraft carrier Clemenceau, on 20 December. After Arafat boarded his vessel and waved to the crowd in the harbor, his followers and the IUM militants saluted him by firing their weapons into the air. The PLO militants reportedly felt a mixture of frustration and relief, as they had lost the battle and had to move abroad, but at least survived the "devastating artillery siege".

The PLO loyalists were moved to Algeria, North Yemen, Tunisia, and Sudan. About 500 disembarked in Cyprus and were then flown to Iraq. Syria and the anti-PLO factions had thus succeeded in expelling Arafat's loyalists from all of Lebanon. However, the IUM remained entrenched in Tripoli, and took control of the previously PLO-held harbor.

==== Sectarian clashes ====
During the Civil War, Lebanese Alawites in the Jabal-Mohsen-based Arab Democratic Party (ADP) aligned with Syria, fought alongside the Syrian Army against the Sunni Islamist Tawhid Movement in Tripoli, which was based mainly in Bab-Tabbaneh. It is worth to mention that prior to the war, the populations of the two neighbourhoods lived side by side.

In August 1984, violent clashes erupted between the Tawheed and the ADP, with the former being supported by the Mosques Committee and the Islamic Committee. The Tawheed's position was strengthened when they gained control of the port on August 22, after street battles left more than 400 dead. The fighting lasted until a Syrian-mediated peace agreement between the IUM and the ADP came into force on September 18 September. By 1985, Tawhid had control over Tripoli, and the ADP was entrenched in Jabal Mohsen.

On December 18 December 1986, the Syrians arrested Tawheed commander Samir al-Hassan in Tripoli. His men responded by killing 15 Syrian soldiers at a checkpoint, leading to Syrian retaliation on the Tawheed. Aided by ADP, Lebanese Communist Party, SSNP, and Baath Party militias, the Syrians decisively defeated the Tawheed, killing many of its fighters, arresting others, and scattering the remainder.

=== Cedar Revolution ===
National protests took place in Lebanon after strings of assassinations on Lebanese politicians took place which was blamed on the Syrian regime occupying Lebanon at the time. No major event took place in Tripoli, however, Secretary-General of Hezbollah Hassan Nasrallah called for protests to counter protest the Cedar revolution in pro-Syrian demonstrations.

=== Islamist insurgency and turbulence ===
==== 2007 Nahr al Bared conflict ====
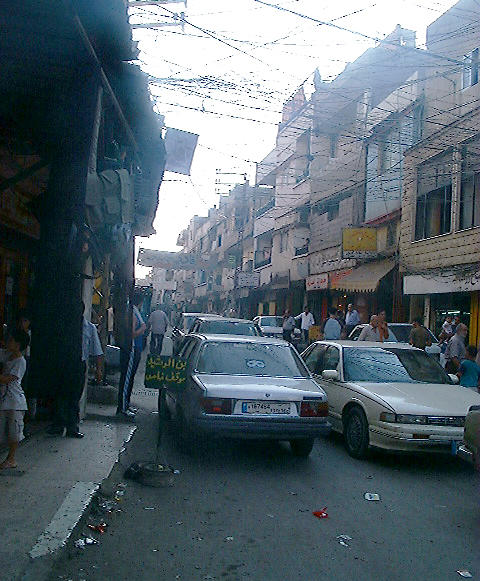
Narrow street in Nahr al-Bared, 2005

Fighting broke out between Fatah al-Islam, an Islamist militant organization, and the Lebanese Armed Forces (LAF) on May 20, 2007, in Nahr al-Bared. The Nahr al-Bared Palestinian refugee camp is home to 400,000 refugees and is situated 16 km north of Tripoli near the coastal road and had been under scrutiny since February, when two buses were bombed in Ain Alak, a predominantly Christian village near Bikfaya. Fatah al-Islam militants based in the camp were blamed. About 30,000 displaced Palestinians live in the camp.

Fighting began in the morning of May 20 after a police raid on a house in Tripoli which was apparently being used by militants from Fatah al-Islam. The militant group subsequently began shooting at the Lebanese security forces who returned fire, triggering clashes in the vicinity of the Nahr al-Bared Palestinian refugee camp near Tripoli. The men reportedly resisted arrest and the violence spread to neighboring streets. Militants then attacked a Lebanese military post at the gate of the camp, killing 27 soldiers during their sleep, seizing several vehicles and also killing an undetermined number of civilians that came to the rescue of the Lebanese army. Despite talks of a cease-fire, Fatah al-Islam militants continued battling the Lebanese army at the outskirts of the refugee camp while Lebanese tanks and artillery continued shelling their positions in the camp. The Lebanese army started multiple ground offensive on the camp.

On June 24, for the first time since May 20, fighting erupted in Tripoli at an apartment building after a military raid on an Islamist militant cell that left 12 people dead. Among the killed were 7 non-Fatah militants, 1 soldier, 1 policeman and 3 civilians. Another 14 soldiers were wounded. On June 28, the military found and engaged a group of Fatah al-Islam militants, in a cave in the mountains south of Tripoli, in fighting that killed 5 Islamists.

==== Bab al Tebana-Jabal Mohsen conflict ====
===== 2008 conflict =====
In 2008 there was a brief intrastate military conflict in Lebanon between opposition militias (mainly Shiite Hezbollah) and pro-government Sunnis, after the 18-month-long political crisis spiraled out of control, when the government's decision to dismantle Hezbollah's telecommunication system, which led to Hezbollah seizing control of west Beirut. Heavy fighting had also broken out between Alawite Hezbollah sympathizers and Sunni supporters of the government in the neighbourhoods of Jabal Mohsen and Bab al-Tabbaneh, two neighbourhoods in Tripoli notorious for its sectarian violence, leading thousands to flee their homes.

On the night of 10 May into the morning of 11 May, fighting broke out between Alawite Hezbollah sympathizers and Sunni supporters of Islamist groups in Tripoli. One woman was killed. On 11 May, Sunni supporters of the Islamic groups had reportedly been fighting opposition followers in the Alawite dominated Jabal Mohsen area with machine-guns and rocket-propelled grenades. On 12 May, clashes in Tripoli left one person dead and at least six others wounded. The Army stated that if clashes did not end by morning the next day, they would use force if necessary to end the fighting.

Between 22 and 23, clashes between pro-government Sunnis based in the Bab el-Tabaneh district and pro-Syrian Alawites from Jabal Mohsen led to the deaths of at least nine people, eight civilians and a policeman; 55 others were wounded. Machine guns and rocket-propelled grenades were used in the clashes, which started around four in the morning.

Between 25 and 29 July, 23 people were killed in clashes between Sunni and Alawite militants. On 8 September, Alawite and Sunni leaders signed a reconciliation agreement which ended the fighting. Sunni Future Movement leader Saad Hariri subsequently visited Tripoli stating "We are both Lebanese and we will not allow anyone to tamper with us. I will do everything I can in order not to let anyone damage the Alawites' security in Tripoli and to foil any external plot to tamper with the security of the Alawites or the security of Tripoli".

Rifa'at Eid, the leader of the armed wing of the ADP, said in an interview: "We're the most convenient targets, the stand-in for Hezbollah; our problem can only be solved when the Shiites and Sunnis solve theirs."

As many as 9,000 Alawites fled their homes during the conflict.

==== Syrian civil war spillover ====
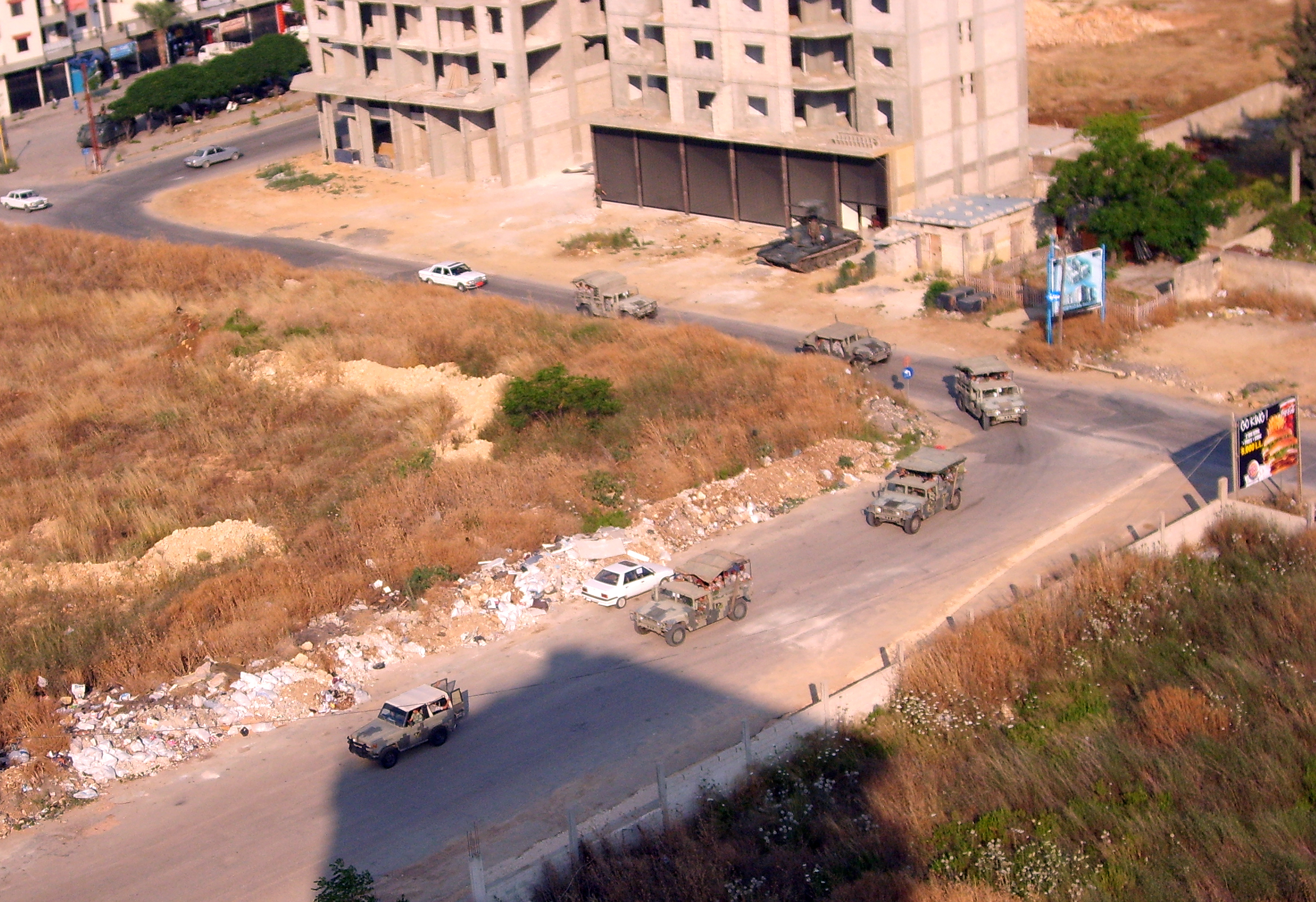
Lebanese army convoy patrolling Jabal Mohsen, a few weeks after the 2011 clashes

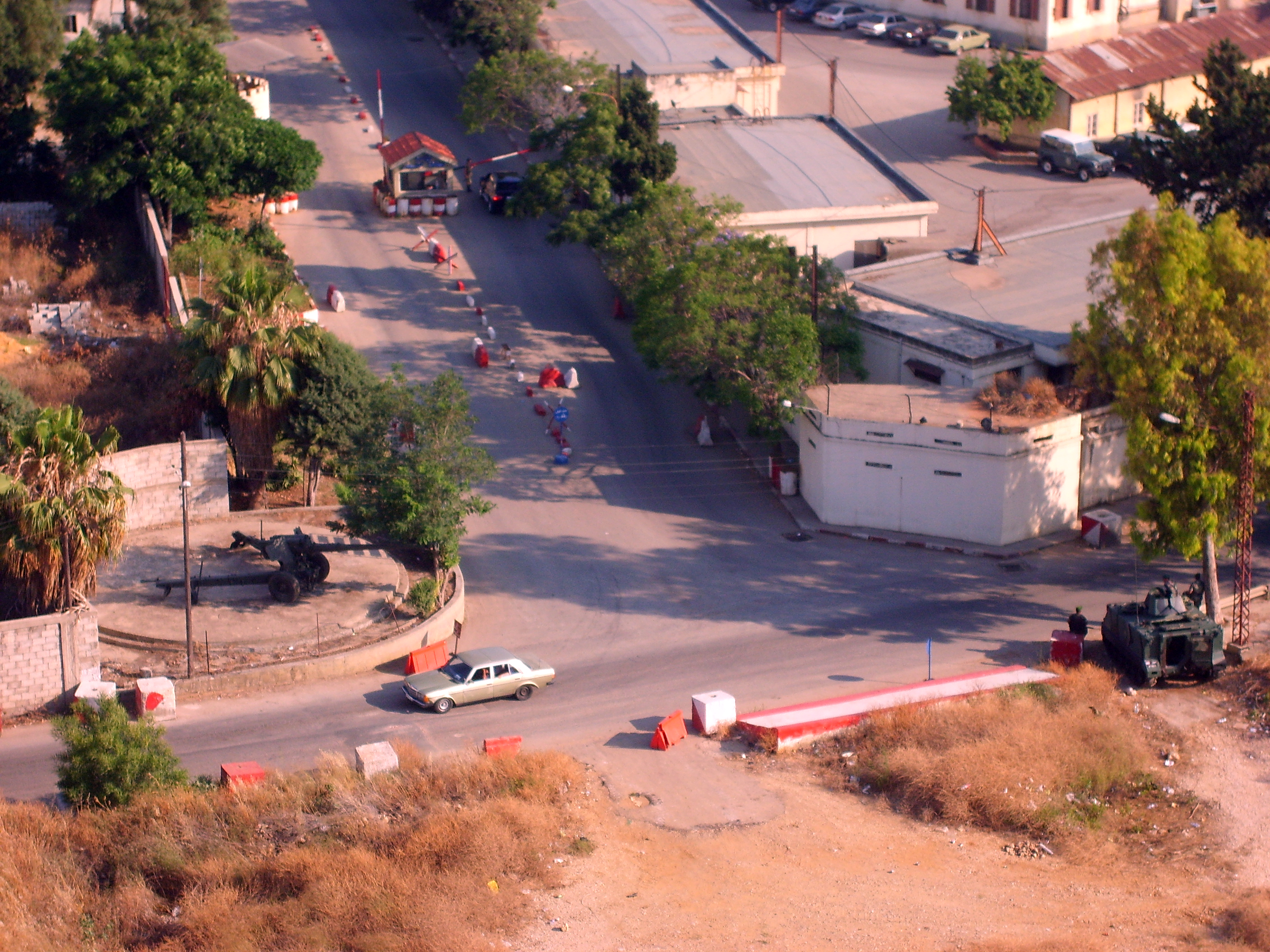
Lebanese army checkpoint on the entry to the Qubbe military base: LAF Northern Command, taken from Jabal Mohsen, 2011

On 17 June 2011, clashes between gunmen in Jabal Mohsen and Bab al-Tabbaneh erupted following a rally in support of Syrian protesters in Bab-al-Tabbaneh. Seven people were killed and 59 were wounded. Among the dead were a Lebanese army soldier and an official from the Alawite ADP.

Between 10 and 11 February 2012, two to three people died due fighting in Jabal Mohsen and Bab al-Tebbaneh. Six Lebanese Army soldiers were injured while attempting to intervene. The skirmishes lead to fears that the Syrian Civil War would spill into Lebanon. Between 12 and 13 May, witness and security officials said two to four people had been killed when fighting erupted between members of the Alawite minority and members of the Sunni majority. The combatants had used rocket-propelled grenades and automatic rifles over the course of the fighting. Hours before the clashes, Lebanese troops had exchanged fire with a group of young Islamists protesting for the release of a terrorist suspect. The exchange of gunfire between the Islamists and the army occurred as the protestors, who were sympathizers with the ongoing revolt in Syria, tried to approach the offices of the pro-Assad Syrian Social Nationalist Party in Lebanon. In all, three of the dead were reportedly Sunni civilians, while one was an army officer. Fighting continued on 14 May, with six more people being killed, five Alawites and one Sunni. The army was deployed to the area on 15 May, and exchanged gunfire with residents. Eight were wounded, including a soldier. By 16 May, the clashes had left 11 dead.

"Western diplomatic sources" stated these incidents were the beginning of a Salafist revolution, aimed at arming the uprising in Syria. The Saudi-backed March 14 coalition accused Syria of trying to bring Lebanon into its crisis. On 14 March figure, Mustafa Alloush stated after the coalition's regular weekly meeting, "It is actually an attempt to make Tripoli a zone of terrorism. It also aims at striking Lebanon's northern area which has welcomed and helped out the Syrian displaced." Tripoli and North Lebanon had seen an influx of Syrian refugees since the unrest in Syria began in March 2011.

By 18 May, a total of 12 people were dead and over 100 wounded from the May clashes. On 21 May, several rocket-propelled grenades were fired between Jabal Mohsen and Bab al-Tebbaneh two neighbourhoods, with no reports of any wounded. On 30 May, two were wounded in clashes between Jabal Mohsen and Bab al-Tebbaneh.

One Sunni-Muslim fought alongside the ADP and was killed in the May clashes, and was condemned as a traitor by his fellow Sunnis. Between 2–3 June, 15 people were killed and over 60 wounded in clashes between Jabal Mohsen and Bab al-Tebbaneh. As a result of the fighting, the Army re-entered Syria Street to set up a buffer zone between the two sides. Following the declaration of a cease-fire, there were several violations of the truce during the night of 3 June, in which one policeman and one soldier were wounded. On 8 June, a man in Jabal Mohsen was killed by sniper fire.

During the fighting, Jabal Mohsen was attacked on several fronts, including the Bab al-Tabbaneh, Shaarani, Baqqar, Riva, Mankoubin and Malouleh districts. In the aftermath, several Alawite businesses in Tripoli were burnt down. On 18 July, one was killed and several were wounded by stray bullets fired during anti-Assad celebrations in Bab Tabbaneh, following a suicide-bombing targeting several Syrian ministers. On 21 July, Tabbaneh residents clashed over non-political matters between two Sunni families, killing two and wounding several. Two more were killed in the dispute on 29 July. On 27 July, two men on their way home to Jabal Mohsen were stabbed by unidentified assailants, which led to clashes between gunmen. Clashes continued the following day, wounding 12, and three soldiers.

VOA report on the Lebanese conflict in August 2012

On 9 August, Sunni supporters of Hezbollah clashed with Salafists in Tripoli. On 20 and 21 August, seven people were killed and more than 100 wounded in clashes between Sunni Muslims and Alawites in a spillover from the war in neighbouring Syria, according to security and medical sources. Two of the dead were from Jabal Mohsen, while the rest were from Bab al-Tabbaneh. Five Lebanese soldiers were injured by gunfire and another five on the next day after a grenade was lobbed at an army checkpoint. Fighting continued throughout 23 August, with at least 2 further deaths reported. Further fighting occurred after a dawn exchange of small arms fire and rocket-propelled grenades between Sunni and Alawite fighters in the Qobbah and Jabal Muhsin neighbourhoods. The skirmish provoked unrest throughout both districts, and at least 7 Alawite-owned shops in Sunni neighbourhoods were torched by unknown assailants. Fighting escalated after the death of Sunni cleric Sheikh Khaled al Baradei, who was shot by a sniper during the morning skirmishes. Sheikh Baradei was reportedly a commander of the Sunni Islamist fighters, and his death led to further sectarian unrest within the city. Two journalists from an unknown news agency were also wounded during the day's fighting. At least 3 killed and 21 wounded were reported. Fighting continued until 24 August.

Clashes broke out on 19 October following the killing of Wissam al-Hassan, leaving one dead. On 21 October, clashes occurred throughout the country which were triggered by the assassination. Two young girls and a man were killed during clashes between Bab Tabbaneh and Jabal Mohsen. The parents of one of the girls, a nine-year-old called Jana, crossed sectarian lines, as her father is Sunni and her mother is Alawite. Two Sunnis and one Alawi were killed on 22 October. By 24 October, 11 people had been killed in the fighting. At least 12 people were killed and 73 injured in Tripoli between 4 and 6 December, as Alawites and Sunnis were involved in heavy clashes, which were sparked by the Tall Kalakh incident, where 20 Lebanese Salafists that were going to join the insurgency in Syria were ambushed.

On 28 February, five men were arrested for throwing grenades into both neighbourhoods. They claimed they had been tasked by "Z.S." to create strife. During March 2013, several sporadic incidents happened between the neighbourhoods. Two were hurt by sniper fire in Jabal Mohsen. Three days later, a man from Jabal Mohsen was shot and killed.

By 22 March, six people, including an army soldier, had been killed. On 23 March, three more people were killed.

On 19 and 20 May, two civilians and two army soldiers were killed during renewed fighting between the neighbourhoods. By 22 May, 12 people had been killed since renewed fighting began. The Lebanese army pulled out of the city on 23 May after being targeted. Six more were killed the following night, following the use of mortars for the first time. 31 were killed by 26 May. After two days of calm, six more were killed by 4 June within 24 hours. Jabal Mohsen was subsequently raided by the army. ADP leader Rifa'at Eid questioned why they had been targeted since similar raids were not done in Bab al-Tabbaneh.

On 29 and 30 November, 13 people were killed by clashes.

On 23 August 2013, twin bombings in Tripoli caused extensive damage with some 47 people killed and more than 500 wounded according to Lebanon's state-run National News Agency. In later conflicts numerous bombings and suicide attacks took place. On 23 August 2013, twin bombings in Tripoli caused extensive damage with some 47 people killed and more than 500 wounded according to Lebanon's state-run National News Agency. In January 2014, Abdul Rahman Diab, an ADP official, was gunned down in his car in Tripoli. Over nine days in March 2014, 25 people were killed and 175 were wounded. On 10 January 2015, two suicide bombers killed 9 people and wounded 30 more in a Jabal Mohsen café. It was the first suicide attack on a civilian neighbourhood in nearly a year, following a security sweep.

=== Liquidity crisis and riots ===
National demonstrations took place in 2019 in protest of corruption, unemployment and government failure. Events were most notable in Tripoli where riots, civil disobedience, civil disorder and demonstrations took place after the government of Hassan Diab announced a nationwide lockdown in 2021, amid hunger, inflation and unemployment increasing, worsening the already deteriorating economy. According to Al Jazeera English, protesters rallied for their third consecutive night in Tripoli as it turned into riots. Police fired live ammunition to disperse protesters. Many people were left wounded in the clashes. Protests occurred during nights in 25–26 January, when the military fired live rounds, rubber bullets and tear gas. At least 60 people and 10 security forces were wounded in the clashes. A protester died in the clashes.

==== Refugee crisis ====
The Lebanese crisis became so severe that multiple boats left the cost holding migrants in a desperate run from the country. Many proved unsuccessful and fatal. In April 2022, 6 people died and around 50 people are rescued after an overloaded boat sinks in Tripoli, Lebanon. And on September 22, at least 94 people were killed when a boat carrying migrants from Lebanon capsizes off Syria's coast. 9 people survived. Many were declared missing and some were found either dead or injured. Dead bodies were sent to nearby hospitals. 40 people are still missing as of 24 September.

== Sources ==
- Mallett, Alex (2014). "ʿAmmār, Banū (Syria)". In Fleet, Kate; Krämer, Gudrun; Matringe, Denis; Nawas, John; Rowson, Everett (eds.). Encyclopaedia of Islam (3rd ed.). Brill Online. ISSN 1873-9830.
- Luz, Nimrod (2002). Lev, Yaacov (ed.). "Tripoli Reinvented: A Case of Mamluk Urbanization". Towns and Material Culture in the Medieval Middle East: 53–71. doi:10.1163/9789004476158_007. ISBN 978-90-04-12543-8. OCLC 9283263430. Wikidata Q115945442.
- Salam-Liebich, Hayat (1983), The Architecture of the Mamluk City of Tripoli, Wikidata Q115915646
- Sarkis, Hassan (1971). "Histoire de Tripoli, I: Des origines à l'occupation franque". Les cahiers de l'Oronte (in French). 10: 80–102. Wikidata Q115934395.
- Sobernheim, Moritz (1909). "Matériaux pour un Corpus Inscriptionum Arabicarum: deuxième partie – Syrie du Nord". Mémoires publiés par les membres de l’Institut français d’archéologie orientale (in French). 25: 37–139. ISSN 0257-411X. Wikidata Q115934456.
