= Ibn Ammar =

Ibn Ammar can refer to:

- al-Hasan ibn Ammar (fl. 962–997), Fatimid general and wasita
- Muhammad ibn Ammar (1031–1086), Andalusian poet and vizier of Seville
- The Banu Ammar family that ruled Tripoli in the 11th century:
  - Jalal al-Mulk Ali ibn Muhammad
  - Fakhr al-Mulk ibn Ammar
