= Fakhr al-Mulk ibn Ammar =

12th-century Qadi of Tripoli and scholar

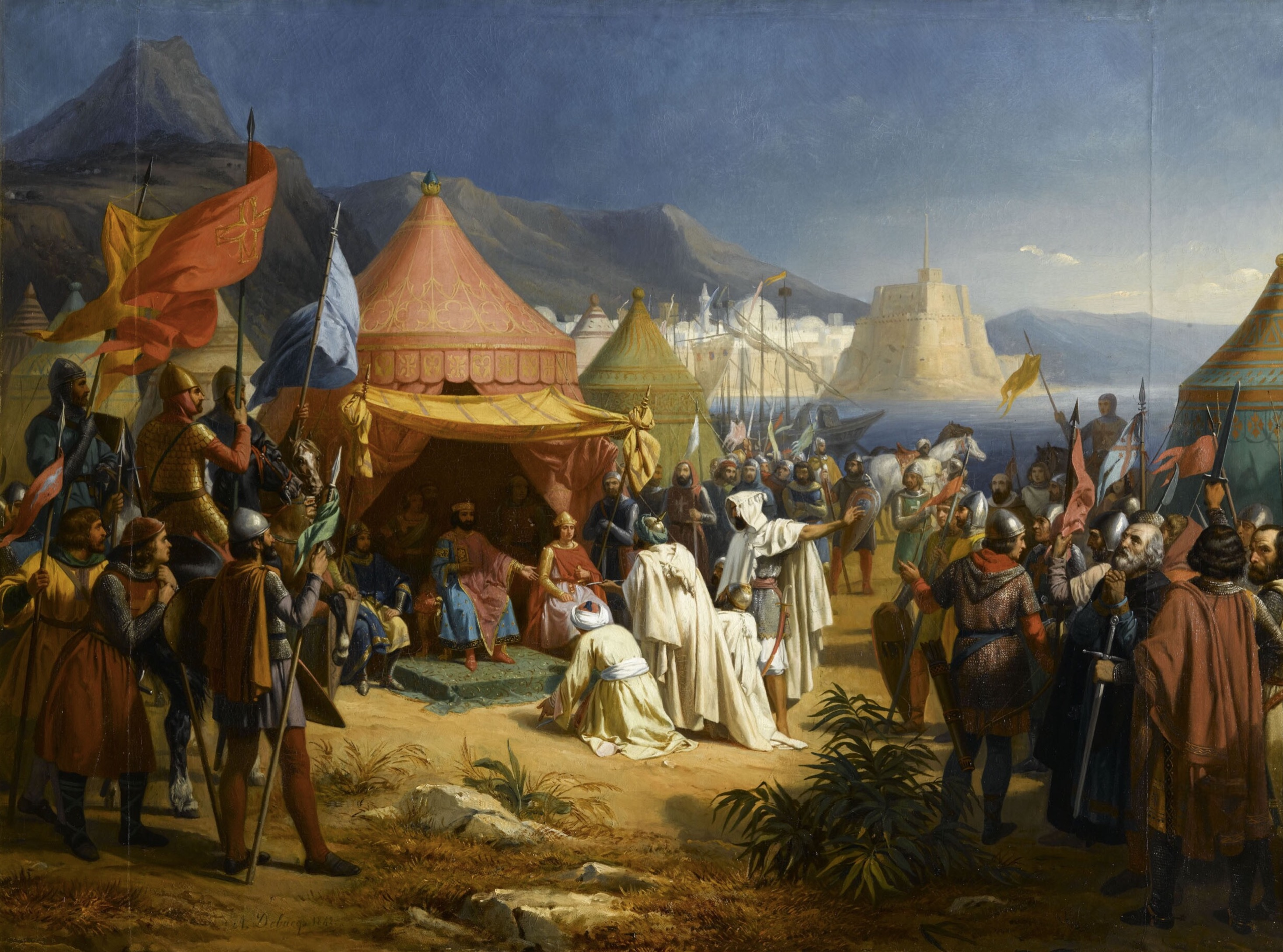
Fakhr al-Mulk ibn Ammar submitting to Bertrand of Toulouse during the Siege of Tripoli, painting by Charles-Alexandre Debacq in 1842

Fakhr al-Mulk ibn Ammar was the last qadi of Tripoli, from 1099 to 1109, before the city was taken by the Crusaders.

== Biography ==
Fakhr al-Mulk was a member of Banu Ammar. He succeeded his brother Jalal al-Mulk Ali ibn Muhammad during the First Crusade. At this point the Banu Ammar's territory spanned from Tartus and the fortresses of Arqa, and Khawabi, in addition to Tripoli, Byblos and Jableh.

In 1099, the Crusaders crossed the country, in which Fakhr al-Mulk concluded an agreement with the envoys of the crusade, granting them the free passage of his state, and even providing them with supplies. However, the envoys dazzled by the riches of Tripoli, reported it to the Crusader leaders, arousing their covetousness. Raymond IV occupied Tartus and Maraclea and besieged Arqa, while Godfrey of Bouillon and Robert Curthose besieged Byblos.

On 9 March 1099, hoping to get Raymond to leave, Fakhr al-Mulk circulated the rumor of an imminent arrival of an Abbasid counter-crusade, but Raymond, far from giving in to panic, called other crusader leaders to his side. Upon their arrival in Arqa, the rumor was denied and Godfrey and Robert, furious at having had to abandon the siege of Byblos, decided to return to Jerusalem. However, Raymond insisted to continue the siege of Tripoli. When the Byzantines offered military aid to Raymond, he agreed to lift the siege on 13 May, as he did not want them to benefit from the conquests, then he negotiated with Fakhr al-Mulk. On 16 May 1099, the crusaders left Tripoli, and went to Beirut on 19 May. Later on, Baldwin I who was heading towards Jerusalem was warned by Fakhr al-Mulk from an ambush near Byblos set by Shams al-Muluk Duqaq, Seljuk ruler of Damascus, when he arrived near Tripoli.

In August 1101, Fakhr al-Mulk captured Taj al-Muluk Buri who acted as a despotic governor of Jableh, yet he was treated well and sent back to Damascus, as he had previously suppressed a rebellion in Jableh two years earlier, which rebelled against Fakhr al-Mulk.

Starting from 1102, Fakhr al-Mulk had to face the continuous attacks of the Crusaders under Raymond, in which he recaptured Tartus in April 1102, and Byblos in April 1104. After the Battle of Harran in 1104, Fakhr al-Mulk asked Sökmen, the former Ortoqid governor of Jerusalem, to intervene; Sökmen marched into Syria but was forced to return home.

Fakhr al-Mulk then attacked Mons Peregrinus in September, 1104, killing many of the Franks and burning down one wing of the fortress. Raymond himself was badly wounded, and died five months later in February, 1105. He was replaced as leader by his nephew William II Jordan. On his deathbed, Raymond had reached an agreement with the qadi: if he would stop attacking the fortress, the crusaders would stop impeding Tripolitanian trade and merchandise. The qadi accepted.

In 1108, it became more and more difficult to bring food to the besieged by land. Many citizens sought to flee to Homs, Tyre, and Damascus. The nobles of the city, who had betrayed the city to the Franks by showing them how it was being resupplied with food, were executed in the crusader camp. Fakhr al-Mulk, left to wait for help from the Seljuk sultan Mehmed I, went to Baghdad at the end of March with five hundred troops and many gifts. He passed through Damascus, now governed by Toghtekin after the death of Duqaq, and was welcomed with open arms. In Baghdad, the sultan received him with great spectacle, but had no time for Tripoli while there was a succession dispute in Mosul. Fakhr al-Mulk returned to Damascus in August, where he learned Tripoli had been handed over to Sharaf ad-Dawla ibn Abi al-Tayyib, wali of al-Afdal Shahanshah, vizier of Egypt, by the nobles, who were tired of waiting for him to return. Eventually, Tripoli surrendered to the Crusaders, and Fakhr al-Mulk took refuge in Jableh. In July 1109, the Crusaders under Tancred captured Jableh, but he let Fakhr al-Mulk to leave freely.

Fakhr al-Mulk remained in the service of the Seljuks, and then entered the service of the atabeg Mawdud of Mosul, and finally of the Abbasid caliph al-Mustazhir. He died in 1118/9. (Note: Other sources indicate that he stayed in Damascus during the surrender of Tripoli, then was settled by Toghtekin in Zabadani, before following his family to Egypt in 1122, where he received his pension from Fatimid Caliph Al-Amir bi-Ahkam Allah by 1129.)

== Sources ==
- Deschamps, Paul (1973). Les châteaux des Croisés en terre sainte III: la défense du comté de Tripoli et de la principauté d'Antioche (in French). Paris: Librairie Orientaliste Paul Geuthner.
- Grousset, René (1934). Histoire des croisades et du royaume franc de Jérusalem.
- Mallett, Alex (2014). "ʿAmmār, Banū (Syria)". In Fleet, Kate; Krämer, Gudrun; Matringe, Denis; Nawas, John; Rowson, Everett (eds.). Encyclopaedia of Islam (3rd ed.). Brill Online. doi:10.1163/1573-3912_ei3_COM_24909. ISSN 1873-9830.
- Nqly, Asya Suleiman (2002). The role of Muslim jurists and scholars in the Near East in the jihad against the Crusaders during the Crusader movement (in Arabic). Obeikan.
- Wiet, G. (1960). "ʿAmmār". In Gibb, H. A. R.; Kramers, J. H.; Lévi-Provençal, E.; Schacht, J.; Lewis, B. & Pellat, Ch. (eds.). The Encyclopaedia of Islam, Second Edition. Volume I: A–B. Leiden: E. J. Brill. p. 448. doi:10.1163/1573-3912_islam_SIM_0625. OCLC 495469456.
