= Charles-Alexandre Debacq =

French painter (1804–1853)

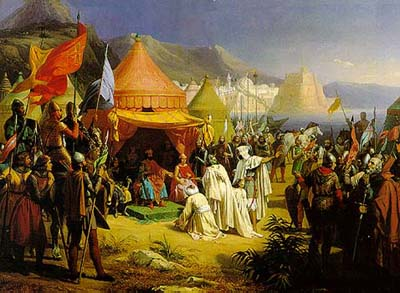
Bertrand of Toulouse at the Siege of Tripoli (1842)

Charles-Alexandre Debacq (1804 in Paris – 1853 in Paris) was a French historical and portrait painter. He became a pupil of Gros, and was greatly appreciated in his own country. There are several pictures by him at Versailles.
