= Jalal al-Mulk Ali ibn Muhammad =

Qadi of Tripoli (r. 1072–1099)

Jalal al-Mulk Abu'l-Hasan
- Reign: 1072–1099
- Predecessor: Amin al-Dawla Abu Talib al-Hasan ibn Ammar
- Successor: Fakhr al-Mulk ibn Ammar
- Died: 1099
- House: Banu Ammar
- Religion: Shi'a Islam

Jalal al-Mulk Ali ibn Muhammad ibn Ammar (Arabic: جلال الملك علي بن محمد بن عمار) was the ruler (qadi) of Tripoli during the First Crusade.

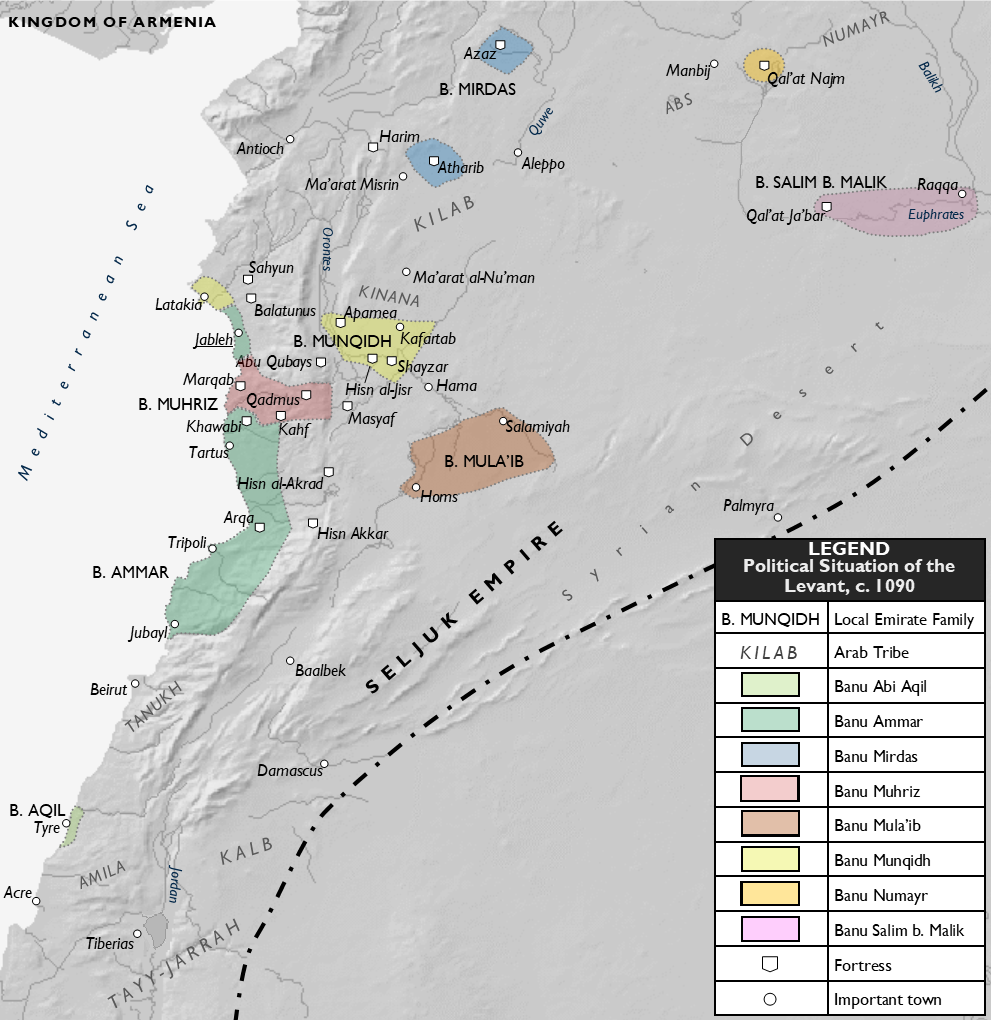
Political map of the Levant around 1085, with the Banu Ammar's territories shaded in green

Ali belonged to the house of the Banu Ammar, which was known more for its learning than for warfare. The dynasty had been founded by his uncle, Amin al-Dawla Abu Talib al-Hasan ibn Ammar, who as qadi of Tripoli had declared himself independent from the Fatimid Caliphate c. 1065. Ali came to power in Tripoli after his uncle's death in 1072, after a brief succession struggle with his brother, whom he expelled from the city. He was able to maintain his precarious independence by playing the Fatimids off the Seljuks. In 1081, he captured Jableh from the Byzantine Empire.

Under Ali's reign, the First Crusade came to the Levant. Following the Siege of Antioch, the Crusaders began to make their way down to Jerusalem in early 1099. Soon, the party of Raymond IV approached Tripoli. Fearing the advancing Crusaders, he attempted to strike an alliance with them.

However, due to the prosperity of Tripoli and the surrounding countryside, Raymond wished to make Tripoli his subject rather than his ally. He soon began the Siege of Arqa, while encouraging Raymond of Pilet and Raymond, Viscount of Turenne to capture Tortosa, a subject of Ali's, as well, which they did. The Siege of Arqa, which lasted from 14 February to 13 May 1099, was a failure, and Raymond was eventually persuaded to leave the city in the hands of Tripoli. As the Crusaders approached Ali's capital, he attempted to buy his immunity. He offered 300 Christian captives, compensating them with 15,000 bezants and 15 horses. The Crusaders left Tripoli untouched on 16 May. Ali did not live to see the long Siege of Tripoli, being succeeded by his brother Fakhr al-Mulk ibn Ammar.

== Sources ==
- Mallett, Alex (2014). "ʿAmmār, Banū (Syria)". In Fleet, Kate; Krämer, Gudrun; Matringe, Denis; Nawas, John; Rowson, Everett (eds.). Encyclopaedia of Islam (3rd ed.). Brill Online. doi:10.1163/1573-3912_ei3_COM_24909. ISSN 1873-9830.
- Runciman, Steven (1951). A History of the Crusades I: The First Crusade. Penguin Classics. ISBN 978-0-141-98550-3.
- Wiet, G. (1960). "ʿAmmār". In Gibb, H. A. R.; Kramers, J. H.; Lévi-Provençal, E.; Schacht, J.; Lewis, B. & Pellat, Ch. (eds.). The Encyclopaedia of Islam, Second Edition. Volume I: A–B. Leiden: E. J. Brill. p. 448. OCLC 495469456.
