= Siege of Tripoli =

1102–1109 siege after the First Crusade

- Part of the Crusades
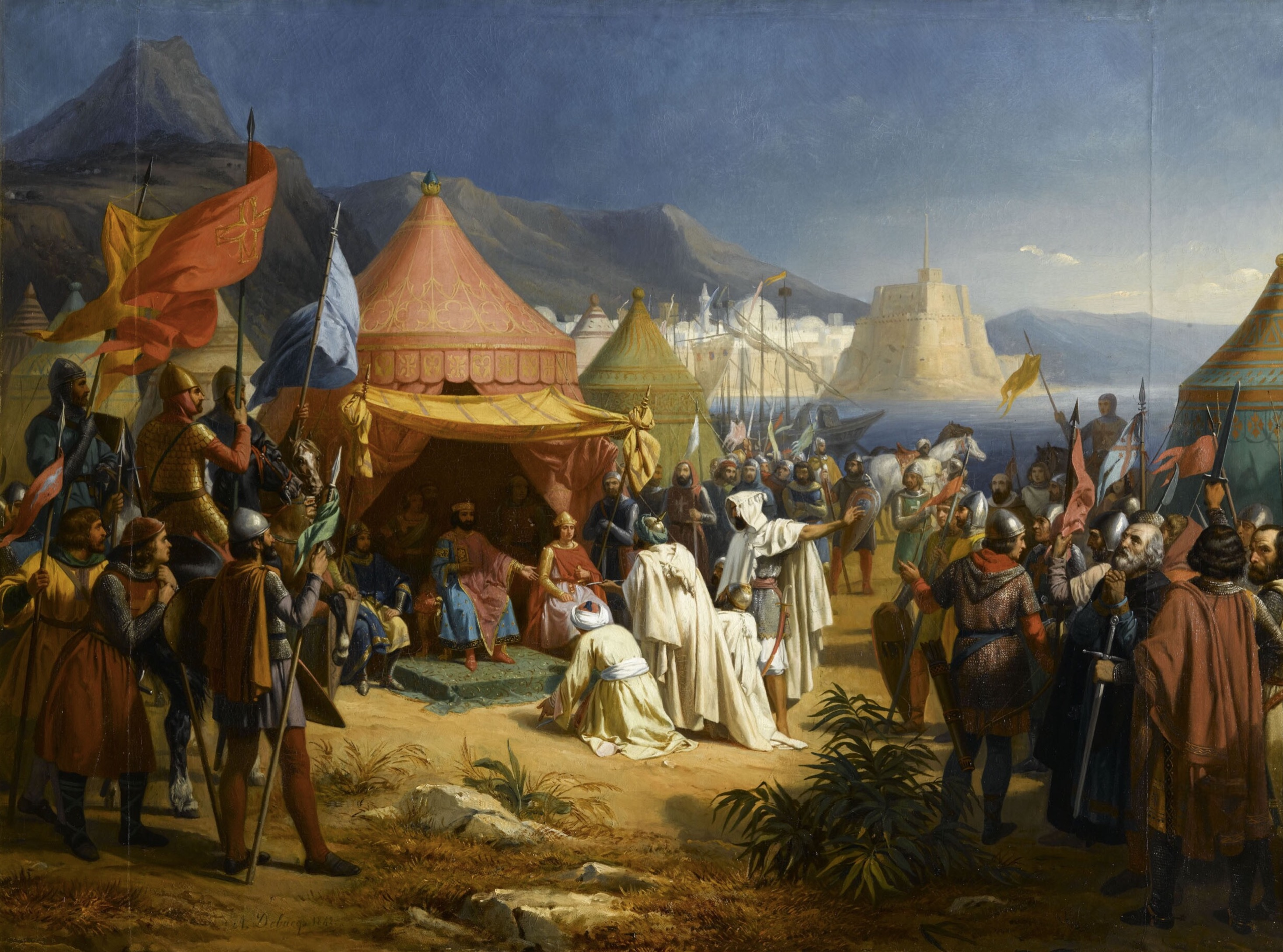
- Fakhr al-Mulk ibn Ammar submitting to Bertrand of Toulouse, 1842 painting by Charles-Alexandre Debacq
Date	1102 – 12 July 1109
Location	The Emirate of Tripoli 34°26′00″N 35°50′40″E
Result	Crusader victory
Territorial changes	Tripoli is captured, becomes the capital of the County of Tripoli

Belligerents
Kingdom of Jerusalem; Principality of Antioch; County of Edessa; County of Toulouse; County of Cerdanya; Republic of Genoa	Banu Ammar emirate of Tripoli; Seljuk Empire; Fatimid Caliphate (from 1108)

Commanders and leaders
Raymond IV of Toulouse (DOW); William II of Cerdanya (WIA); Bertrand of Toulouse; Baldwin I of Jerusalem; Baldwin II of Edessa; Tancred of Galilee	Fakhr al-Mulk ibn Ammar; Sharaf ad-Dawla ibn Abi al-Tayyib (from 1108)

Strength
Unknown number of Crusaders; Large Genoese fleet	Unknown

Casualties and losses
Unknown	Unknown
- Location within Lebanon Siege of Tripoli (Eastern Mediterranean)

The siege of Tripoli lasted from 1102 until 12 July 1109. It took place on the site of the present day Lebanese city of Tripoli, in the aftermath of the First Crusade. It led to the establishment of the fourth Crusader state, the County of Tripoli.

== Background ==
In 1095, Pope Urban II called for a crusade at the Council of Clermont (Deos lo vult). In addition to aiding Byzantium, which was under threat from the Seljuks, the goal was to reach the Holy Land and liberate Jerusalem.Following the capture of Jerusalem and the subsequent founding of the Latin Kingdom of Jerusalem most crusaders moved home.Driven by letters from Palestine requesting reinforcements, Pope Urban II called for a second expedition to the Holy Land in April 1099.

Following the capture of Ankara, the Crusaders faced repeated attacks. The Battle of Mersivan led to a breakdown of the Christian army, with only Raymond IV of Toulouse Stephen of Blois and Stephen of Burgundy, escaping back to Constantinople while many were killed. After the Lombards had left another army under William of Aquitaine and Welf of Bavaria had arrived at Constantinople. Those taking the land route set off in mid-July, following the path taken by the First Crusade. With dwindling provisions out outside Byzantine territory they faced increased Turkish attacks. Upon reaching Ereghli by early September, they defeated by a Seljuk army under Kilij Arslan. Having survived William of Aquitaine managed to escape to Antioch. When Raymond arrived at Antioch he was being taken prisoner by Tancred and being forced to swear to him that he would lay no further claim to Antioch or to any city dependent on that province. As an ally of Alexios Komnenos and, thus, disliked by the other crusaders, Raymond having disappointed the emperor could no longer hope of being leader of the crusade or mediator between Byzantium and the West. Giving up the idea of returning home, he had vowed to stay in the Holy Land until his death, Raymond decided to conquer Tripoli.

== Prelude ==
Together with William of Aquitaine and Welf of Bavaria and strengthened by his Provençals from Latakia and a Genoese fleet, entered syria capturing Tortosa on 18 February 1102. Using it as a base for capturing Tripoli he claimed he would only protect it from the jealous normans.

== Siege ==
In 1102 with the aid of Byzantine engineers, Raymond constructed Mons Peregrinus—"Pilgrim's mountain" or "Qalaat Saint-Gilles" ("fortress of Saint-Gilles")—in order to block Tripoli's access inland. With the Genoese Hugh Embriaco, Raymond also seized Gibelet. After the Battle of Harran on 7 May 1104, Fakhr al-Mulk asked Sokman, the former Ortoqid governor of Jerusalem, to intervene; Sokman marched into Syria but was forced to return home.

Fakhr al-Mulk attacked Mons Peregrinus in September 1104, killing many of the Franks and burning down one wing of the fortress. Raymond was badly wounded and died five months later in February 1105. He was replaced by his nephew William II Jordan, Count of Cerdanya. On his deathbed, Raymond had reached an agreement with Fakhr al-Mulk: if he would stop attacking the fortress, the Crusaders would stop impeding Tripolitanian trade and merchandise. Fakhr al-Mulk accepted.

In 1108, it became more difficult to bring food to the besieged by land. Many citizens sought to flee to Homs, Tyre, and Damascus. The nobles of the city, who had betrayed the city to the Franks by showing them how it was being resupplied with food, were executed in the Crusader camp. Fakhr al-Mulk, waiting for help from the Seljuk Sultan Mehmed I, went to Baghdad in March with 500 troops and many gifts. He passed through Damascus, governed by Toghtegin after the death of Duqaq, and was welcomed with open arms. In Baghdad, the sultan received him with great spectacle but had no time for Tripoli while there was a succession dispute in Mosul. Fakhr al-Mulk returned to Damascus in August, where he learned Tripoli had been handed over to Sharaf ad-Dawla ibn Abi al-Tayyib, wali of al-Afdal Shahanshah, vizier of Egypt, by the nobles who were tired of waiting for him to return.

In 1109 the Crusaders gathered in force outside Tripoli, led by Baldwin I of Jerusalem, Baldwin II of Edessa, Tancred, regent of Antioch, William II Jordan, and Raymond IV's eldest son Bertrand of Toulouse, who had recently arrived with fresh Genoan, Pisan and Provençal troops. Tripoli waited in vain for reinforcements from Egypt.

A compromise decided in the course of a dispute beneath the walls of the city, and arbitrated by Baldwin of Jerusalem, allowed the city to be captured: the County of Tripoli would be divided between the two claimants, William II Jordan as a vassal of the Principality of Antioch, and Bertrand as a vassal of Jerusalem.

On 12 July the city was sacked by the Crusaders. One hundred thousand volumes of the Dar-em-Ilm library were deemed "impious" and burned. The Egyptian fleet arrived eight hours too late. Many of the inhabitants were enslaved, the others were deprived of their possessions and expelled. Bertrand had William II Jordan assassinated in 1110 and claimed two-thirds of the city for himself, with the other third given to the Genoans. Thus Tripoli became a Crusader state; the rest of the Mediterranean coast had already fallen to the Crusaders or would pass to them within the next few years, with the capture of Sidon in 1110 and Tyre in 1124 during the Venetian Crusade.

== Bibliography ==
- Nqly, Asya Suleiman (2002). The role of Muslim jurists and scholars in the Near East in the jihad against the Crusaders during the Crusader movement. Obeikan.
- Riley-Smith, Jonathan (October 1983). "The Motives of the Earliest Crusaders and the Settlement of Latin Palestine, 1095-1100". The English Historical Review. 98 (389). Oxford University Press: 721–736. doi:10.1093/ehr/xcviii.ccclxxxix.721. JSTOR 567757.
- Riley-Smith, Jonathan; et al. (The New Cambridge Medieval History) (2004). "The crusades, 1095-1198". In Luscome, David; Riley-Smith, Jonathan (eds.). c. 1024 – c. 1198 Part I. Vol. IV. Cambridge: Cambridge University Press. ISBN 978-0-521-41410-4.
- Mayer, Hans Eberhard; et al. (The New Cambridge Medieval History) (2004). "The Latin east 1098-1205". In Luscome, David; Riley-Smith, Jonathan (eds.). c. 1024 – c. 1198 Part II. Vol. IV. Cambridge: Cambridge University Press. ISBN 978-0-521-41411-1.
- Runciman, Steven (1951). The First Crusade. A History of the Crusades. Vol. I. Cambridge: Cambridge University Press.
- Lewis, Kevin James (2017). The Counts of Tripoli and Lebanon in the Twelfth Century. New York: Routledge. ISBN 978-1-4724-5890-2.
- Eddé, Anne Marie; et al. (The New Cambridge History of Islam) (2011). "Bilād al Shām, from the Fātimid conquest to the fall of the Ayyūbids (359 – 668/970 – 1260)". In Maribel Fierro (ed.). The Western Islamic World Eleventh to Eighteenth Centuries. Vol. II. Cambridge: Cambridge University Press. ISBN 978-0-521-83957-0.
- Angold, Micheal; et al. (The Cambridge History of The Byzantine Empire c. 500-1492) (2008). Jonathan Shepard (ed.). Belle époque or crisis (1025 – 1118). Cambridge: Cambridge University Press. ISBN 978-0-521-83231-1.
- Tyerman, Christopher (2006). God's War: A New History of the Crusades. Cambridge, Mass.: Harvard University Press. ISBN 0-6-7402-387-0.
- Mulinder, Alec (2006). "A-C". In Murray, Alan V. (ed.). The Crusades: An Encyclopedia. Vol. I. Santa Barbara: ABC CLio. ISBN 1-57607-862-0.
- Oldenbourg, Zoe (1966). The Crusades. New York: Pantheon Books.
- Hill, John Hugh (1962). Raymond IV, Count of Toulouse. Syracuse, New York: Syracuse University Press.
