= Citadel of Tripoli =

12th-century fortress in Tripoli, Lebanon

Coordinates: 34.4334°N 35.8445°E

- قلعة طرابلس
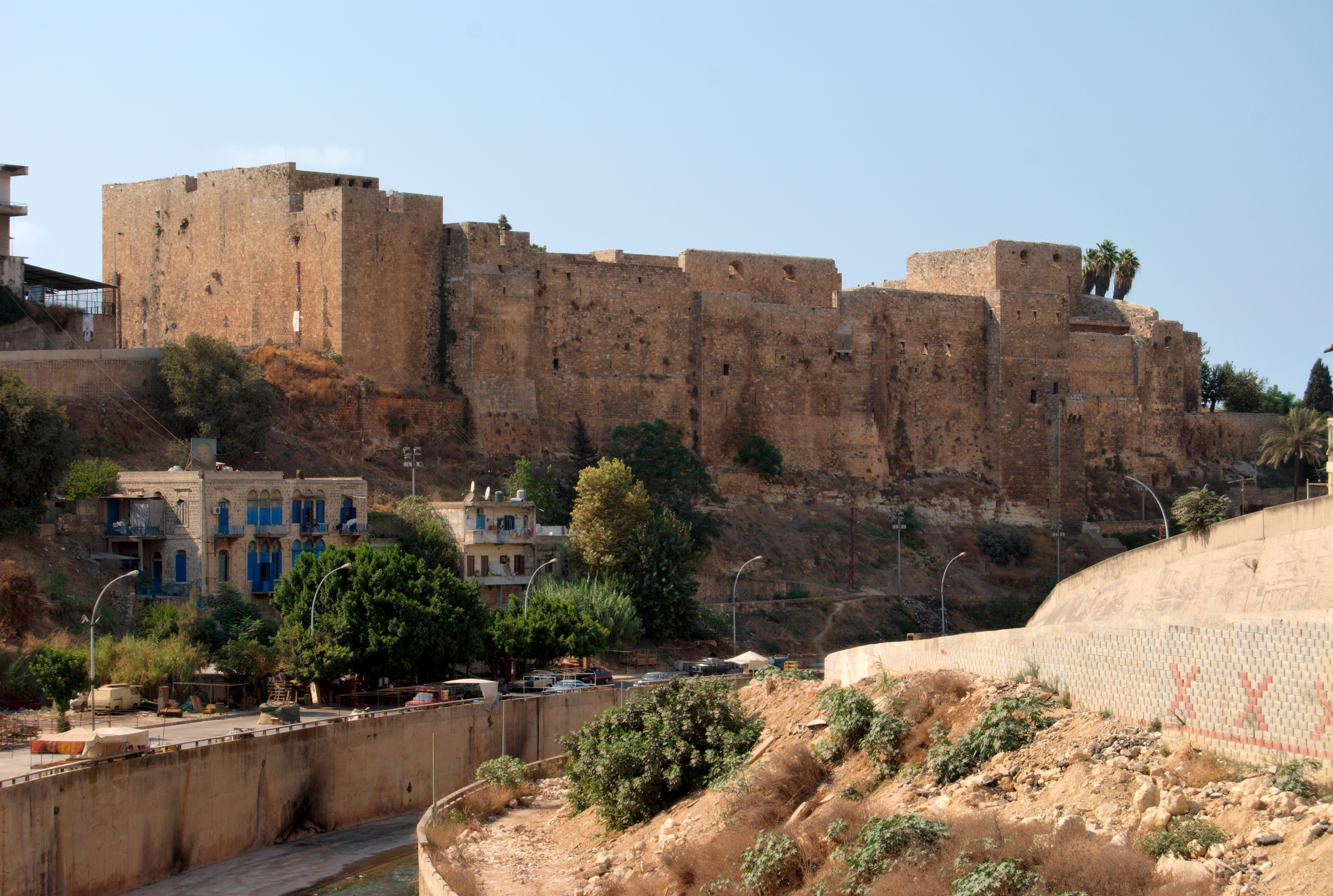
- The citadel in 2009
- Interactive map of the Citadel of Tripoli area
- Former names: Castle of Mount Pilgrim
- Alternative names: Castle of Saint-Gilles

General information
- Location: Tripoli, Lebanon
- Years built: between 1102 and 1109

The Citadel of Tripoli (Arabic: قَلْعَة طَرَابُلُس ALA-LC: Qalʻat Ṭarābulus) is a 12th-century fortress in Tripoli, Lebanon. It was built at the top of a hill "during the initial Frankish siege of the city between 1102 and 1109" on the orders of Raymond de Saint-Gilles, who baptized it the Castle of Mount Pilgrim (French: château du Mont-Pèlerin; Latin: castellum Montis Peregrini) while local Muslims have been referring to it as the Castle of Saint-Gilles (Arabic: قَلْعَة سَان جِيل Qalʻat Sān Jīl).

Very little of the original structure has survived, the castle having been rebuilt several times, and for the last time in the early 19th century, when the citadel was extensively restored and rebuilt by the Ottoman governor of Tripoli Mustafa Agha Barbar. The citadel nowadays houses the North Lebanon & Akkar Museum.

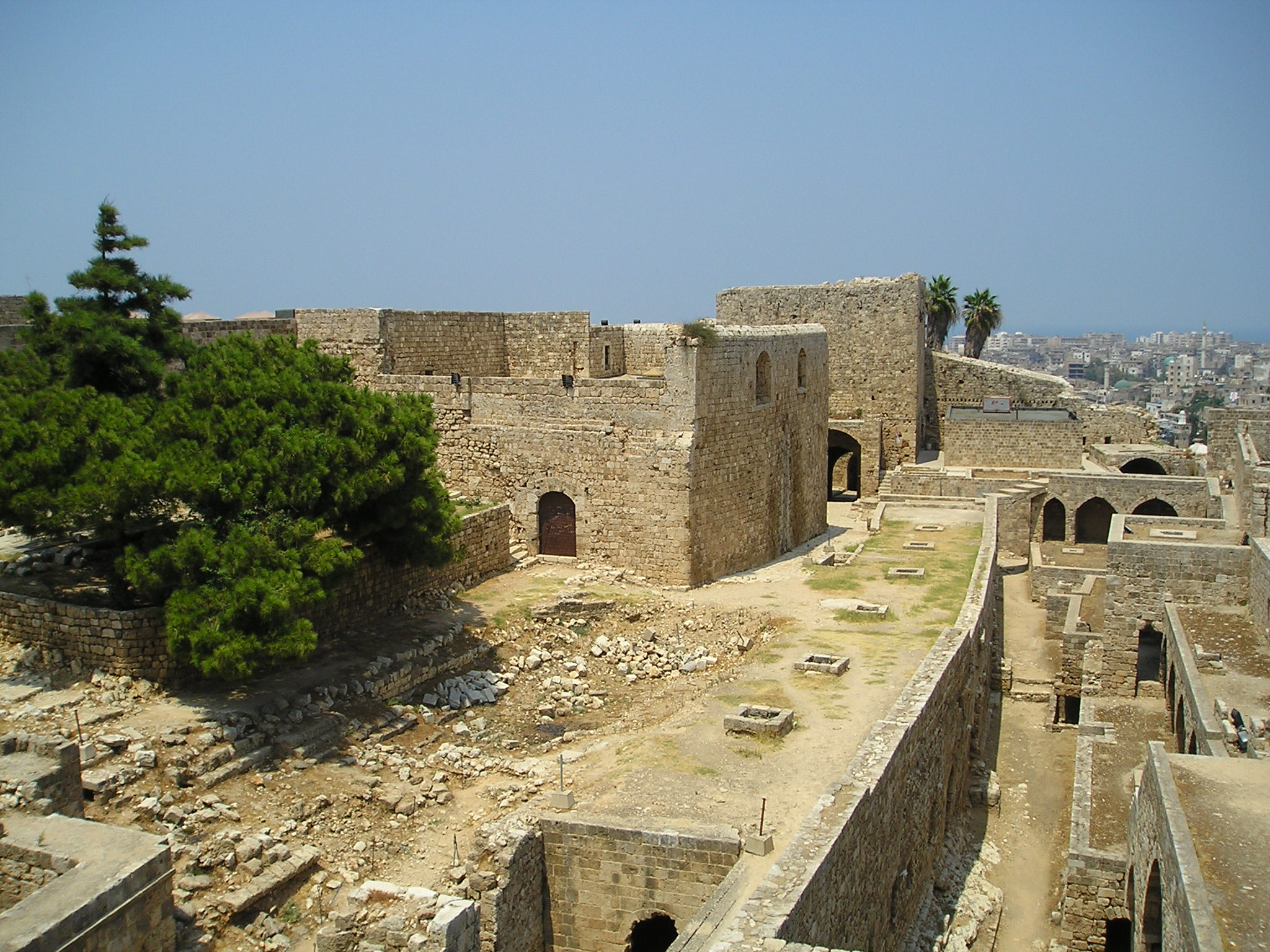
The Citadel of Tripoli

== History ==
The first cornerstone was set in the 9th century during the conquest of Tripoli by Sufyan al-azadi, it was a fort 2 miles away from the old city on a strategic hill. The fort was gradually fortified and rebuilt with time by many succeeding rulers. In the citadel there are many clues of past nations including the remains of a Fatimid mosque. The citadel was built on the orders of Raymond of Saint-Gilles during the siege of Tripoli. The hill where the citadel stands had previously been the site of an 11th-century Shi'i cemetery, which the crusaders destroyed. When the Mont Pèlerin quarter was set ablaze by the Mamluks after the reconquest, the castle of Saint-Gilles suffered and stood abandoned on the hilltop for the next eighteen years. It was essential to have an adequate stronghold in Tripoli for the sultan's troops, temporarily garrisoned in Hisn al-Akrad (Krak des Chevaliers), as the distance was too great in case of enemy attack.

Abu'l-Fida and Ibn al-Wardi record that, among the important events which took place in 1345, was the promulgation of a military decree which was set up by order of the Mamluk Sultan al-Kamil Sha'ban in the citadels of Aleppo, Tripoli, Hisn al-Akrâd and other fortified places. The decree, put over the second entrance way of the citadel of Tripoli, is by far the best preserved. Apparently this sultan, who lived a life of luxury and debauchery, was in constant need of extra revenue. In order to fill his depleted treasury, he imposed a heavy registration tax upon all feudal land concessions and appropriations. This tax was unpopular and was obviously going to stir up discontent among his subjects. To forestall any uprising and gain the support of his troops, upon whom his power was based he issued this military decree. It was the custom that a Mamluk soldier, under contract for a specified number of years, received an annual gratuity which amounted to slightly over eleven days extra pay. If the soldier died before the end of his contract, the sultan had the right to claim the extra sum of money which had accumulated during the soldier's years of service. Sha'bán abandoned his rights to this claim, once and for all, hoping thus to enlist the support of his troops.

In 1516, Syria and Egypt fell to the Ottoman Sultan Selim I. His son and successor Suleiman I, called the Magnificent (1520-1566), soon after his accession made an inspection tour of his newly-conquered lands. He gathered about him in Damascus all his provincial governors and on this occasion took the decision to rebuild the citadel of Tripoli.

In the years that followed, various Ottoman governors of Tripoli did restoration work on the citadel to suit their needs and with time the medieval crenelated battlements were destroyed in order to open sally ports for cannons.

Very little of the original Crusader structure has survived until this day. The graves of a number of nameless Frankish knights, here and there, are the only bits of evidence today evocative of their presence on the heights of Tripoli's "Pilgrim's Mountain" many centuries ago.

== North Lebanon & Akkar Museum ==
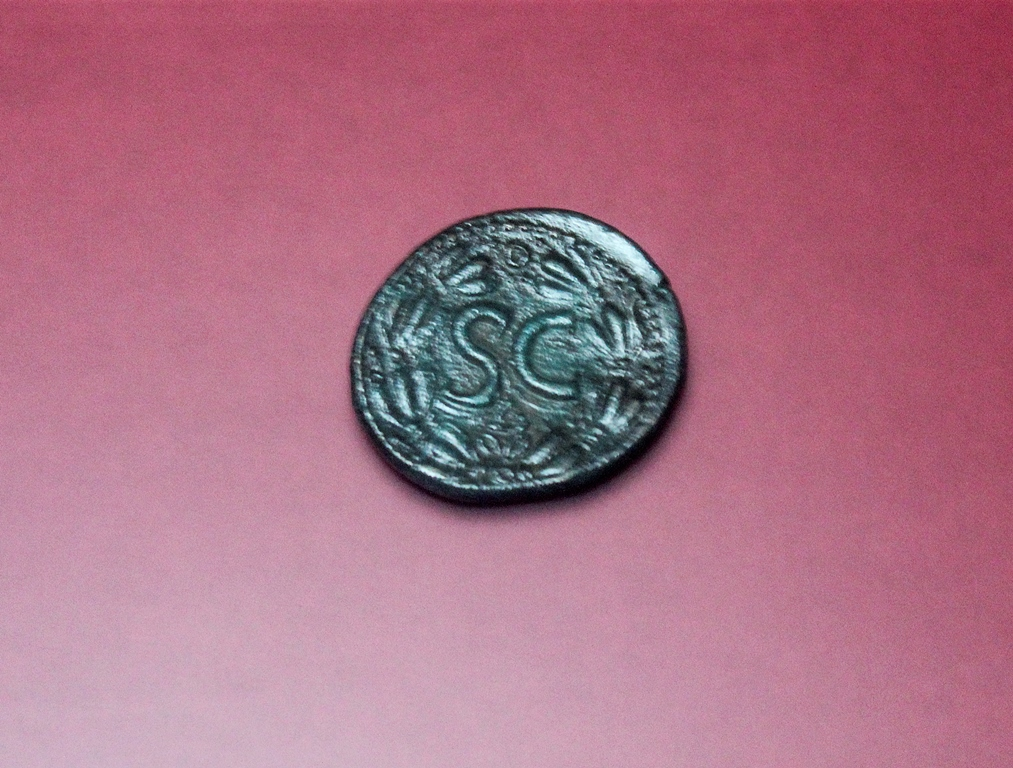
Coin from Tripoli, 2nd century BCE

The citadel houses the North Lebanon & Akkar Museum. The small museum has a numismatic collection covering most periods from the Hellenic to the Ayyubid one.

== Tripoli landmark map ==
City Centre of Tripoli, Lebanon
Legend
1 Citadel of Tripoli
2 Tripoli Clock Tower
3 Al-Saʼeḥ Library
4 St George Cathedral
5 Al-Tawbat Mosque
6 Al-Attar Mosque
7 Al-Burtasi Mosque
8 Al-Uwaysiyat Mosque
9 Abd al-Wahid Mosque
10 Mansouri Great Mosque
11 Mu'allaq Mosque
12 Taynal Mosque

== See also ==
- Architecture of Lebanon
- List of Crusader castles
