= Banu Ammar =

10th-12th century Levantine Shia-Berber dynasty

- Qadis, Emirs
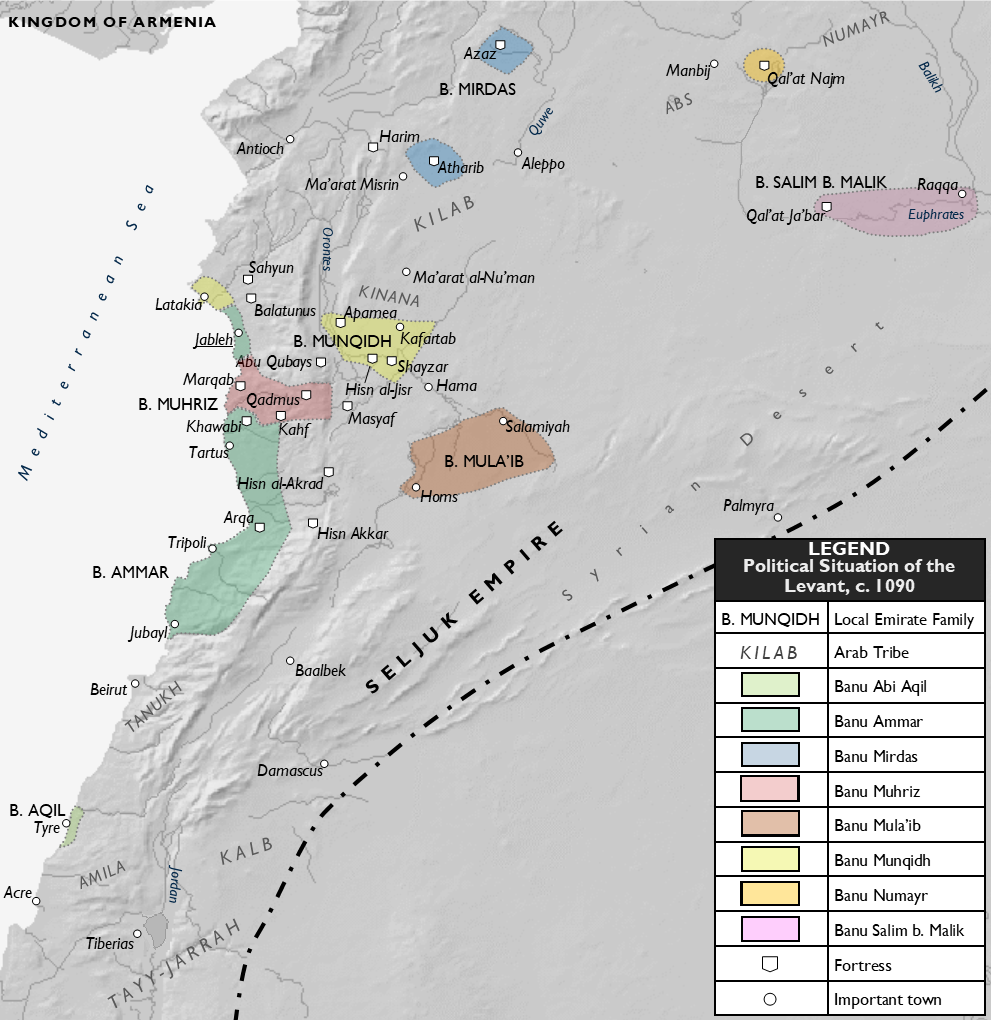
- Political map of the Levant around 1085, with the Banu Ammar's territories shaded in green
- Founded: 10th century
- Final ruler: Fakhr al-Mulk ibn Ammar
- Dissolution: 1109

The Banu Ammar (Arabic: بنو عمار, romanized: Banū ʿAmmār, lit. 'Sons of Ammar') were a family of Shia Muslim magistrates (qadis) who ruled the city of Tripoli in what is now Lebanon from c.1065 until 1109.

== History ==
The Banu Ammar were descended from the Berber tribe of the Kutama, which was the mainstay of the early Fatimid Caliphate. The dynasty in Tripoli was founded by Amin al-Dawla Abu Talib al-Hasan ibn Ammar, who was the Fatimid-appointed qadi of Tripoli when the local Fatimid governor, Mukhtar al-Dawla ibn Bazzal, died circa 1065. Amin al-Dawla declared himself the independent ruler of the town, ruling a territory extending from Akkar in the north to Jubayl (Byblos) in the south. His reign ended with his death two years later.

Amin al-Dawla's two nephews fought for the succession, with one of them, Jalal al-Mulk Ali ibn Muhammad, emerging victorious and exiling his brother. Jalal al-Mulk ruled the city in a precarious diplomatic balancing act between the Fatimids to the south and the Seljuks to the east. In 1081, he captured Jableh from the Byzantine Empire. As part of his strategy to enhance Tripoli's position, he invested large sums in turning the city a famous centre for learning, founding a "House of Knowledge" that attracted scholars, as well as a notable library of reportedly 100,000 volumes.

After Jalal al-Mulk's death in 1099, he was succeeded by his brother, Fakhr al-Mulk, whose accession coincided with the arrival of the First Crusade. At this point the Banu Ammar's territory spanned the port town of Tartus and the fortresses of Arqa, north of Tripoli, and Khawabi, north of Tartus, in addition to Tripoli, Jubayl and Jableh. Fakhr al-Mulk faced the continuous attacks of the Crusaders under Raymond of Saint-Gilles. Tartus was captured in 1099, but recaptured by the Banu Ammar until falling firmly into Crusader hands under Raymond in April 1102. The family lost Jubayl to Raymond in April 1104. He left the city in 1108 to rally the Sunni rulers at Damascus and Baghdad to his assistance, but was deposed by the populace in a pro-Fatimid revolt. The Fatimids sent a fleet to the city, but it arrived only eight days after its fall to the Crusaders. In July 1109 the Crusaders under Tancred captured Jableh. Fakhr al-Mulk remained in the service of the Seljuks, and then entered the service of the atabeg Mawdud of Mosul, and finally of the Abbasid caliph al-Mustazhir. He died in 1118/9.

== Sources ==
- Deschamps, Paul (1973). Les châteaux des Croisés en terre sainte III: la défense du comté de Tripoli et de la principauté d'Antioche (in French). Paris: Librairie Orientaliste Paul Geuthner.
- Harris, William (2012). Lebanon: A History, 600–2011. Oxford University Press. ISBN 9780199720590.
- Mallett, Alex (2014). "ʿAmmār, Banū (Syria)". In Fleet, Kate; Krämer, Gudrun; Matringe, Denis; Nawas, John; Rowson, Everett (eds.). Encyclopaedia of Islam (3rd ed.). Brill Online. doi:10.1163/1573-3912_ei3_COM_24909. ISSN 1873-9830.
- Wiet, G. (1960). "ʿAmmār". In Gibb, H. A. R.; Kramers, J. H.; Lévi-Provençal, E.; Schacht, J.; Lewis, B. & Pellat, Ch. (eds.). The Encyclopaedia of Islam, Second Edition. Volume I: A–B. Leiden: E. J. Brill. p. 448. doi:10.1163/1573-3912_islam_SIM_0625. OCLC 495469456.
