= List of cathedrals in California =

This is a list of cathedrals in the state of California, United States:

Municipality	Cathedral	Image	Location & References
Alhambra (Los Angeles area)	St. Steven's Cathedral (Serbian Orthodox)		34°03′45″N 118°08′53″W
Burbank (Los Angeles area)	St. Leon Cathedral (Armenian Church in America) (Oriental Orthodox Communion)		34°12′22″N 118°20′30″W
Burbank (Los Angeles area)	St. Ephraim Cathedral (Syriac Orthodox) (Oriental Orthodox Communion)		34°11′22″N 118°18′50″W
Daly City (San Francisco area)	St. George's Cathedral (Ecumenical Patriarchate Vicariate for Palestinian-Jordanian Communities)		37°40′33″N 122°28′16″W
El Cajon (San Diego area)	St. Peter's Cathedral (Chaldean Catholic)		32°45′14″N 116°55′27″W
Fresno	St. John's Cathedral (Roman Catholic)		36°44′26″N 119°46′57″W
Fresno	St. James Cathedral (Episcopal Church)		36°47′16″N 119°45′20″W
Garden Grove (Orange County)	Christ Cathedral (Roman Catholic)		33°47′14.63″N 117°53′56.16″W
Glendale (Los Angeles area)	St. Gregory the Illuminator Cathedral (Armenian Catholic)		34°09′54.5″N 118°33′58.4″W
Long Beach (Los Angeles area)	All Saints Anglican Cathedral (Anglican Church in North America)		33°46′10.6″N 118°08′45.9″W
Los Angeles	Cathedral of Our Lady of the Angels (Roman Catholic)		34°3′30″N 118°14′45″W
Los Angeles	St John's Cathedral (Episcopal)		34°01′39″N 118°16′32″W
Los Angeles	St. Sophia Cathedral (Greek Orthodox)		34°02′45″N 118°17′58″W
Los Angeles	Our Lady of Mt. Lebanon-St. Peter Cathedral (Maronite Catholic)		34°04′21″N 118°22′39″W
Los Angeles	St. Anne Melkite Greek Catholic Cathedral (Melkite Greek Catholic Church)		34°09′02″N 118°22′32″W
Los Angeles	Holy Virgin Mary Russian Orthodox Cathedral (Orthodox Church in America)		34°04′50″N 118°16′47″W
Los Angeles	St Nicholas Cathedral (Antiochian Orthodox)		34.063671°N 118.275219°W
Los Angeles	Holy Transfiguration Cathedral (Russian Orthodox Church Outside Russia)		34°05′43″N 118°18′29″W
Los Angeles	Pro-Cathedral of St. Vladimir (Ukrainian Orthodox Church of the USA)		34°05′02″N 118°17′17″W
Los Angeles	St Mary's Byzantine Catholic Proto-Cathedral (Byzantine Catholic)		34°10′02″N 118°28′01″W
Los Angeles	Church of Our Saviour and the Holy Apostles Pro-Cathedral (Anglican Province of Christ the King)		34°03′32″N 118°22′06″W
Modesto	Mar Zaia Cathedral (Assyrian Church of the East)		37°41′47″N 120°58′21″W
Montebello (Los Angeles area)	Holy Cross Cathedral (Armenian Apostolic Church) (Oriental Orthodox Communion)		34°01′17″N 118°06′22″W
Monterey	Cathedral of San Carlos Borromeo (Roman Catholic)		36°35′45″N 121°53′28″W
Oakland	Cathedral of Christ the Light (Roman Catholic)		37°48′38″N 122°15′47″W
Oakland	Ascension Cathedral (Greek Orthodox)		37°48′34″N 122°12′04″W
Sacramento	Blessed Sacrament Cathedral (Roman Catholic)		38°34′44″N 121°29′32″W
Sacramento	Trinity Cathedral (Episcopal)		38°34′14″N 121°28′21″W
San Bernardino	Our Lady of the Rosary Cathedral (Roman Catholic)		34°08′20″N 117°17′22″W
San Diego	St Joseph Cathedral (Roman Catholic)		32°43′18″N 117°09′42″W
San Diego	St. Paul's Cathedral (Episcopal)		32°44′01″N 117°09′36″W
San Francisco	Cathedral of St. Mary of the Assumption (Roman Catholic)		37°47′03″N 122°25′31″W
San Francisco	Old Saint Mary's Cathedral (Roman Catholic)		37°47′34″N 122°24′21″W
San Francisco	Grace Cathedral (Episcopal)		37°47′31″N 122°24′47″W
San Francisco	Annunciation Cathedral (Greek Orthodox)		37°46′08″N 122°25′18″W
San Francisco	Holy Trinity Orthodox Cathedral (Orthodox Church in America)		37°47′52″N 122°25′27″W
San Francisco	Holy Virgin Cathedral (Russian Orthodox Church Outside Russia)		37°46′49″N 122°29′10″W
San Francisco	St. Nicholas Cathedral (Russian Orthodox Patriarchate of Moscow)		37°45′57″N 122°25′45″W
San Jose	Cathedral Basilica of St. Joseph (Roman Catholic)		37°20′03″N 121°53′27″W
San Jose	Trinity Cathedral (Episcopal)		37°20′16″N 121°53′27″W
Santa Rosa	Cathedral of St. Eugene (Roman Catholic)		38°26′50″N 122°41′16″W
Stockton	Cathedral of the Annunciation (Roman Catholic)		37°57′47″N 121°17′59″W

== See also ==
- List of cathedrals in the United States
