= Cyril Salim Bustros =

Lebanese archbishop

His Excellency, The Most Reverend Cyril Salim Bustros, S.M.S.P.
- Church: Melkite Greek Catholic
- See: Beirut and Byblos
- In office: 15 June 2011 — 9 November 2018
- Previous posts: Archbishop of Baalbeck, Eparch of Newton

Orders
- Ordination: June 29, 1962
- Consecration: November 27, 1988

Personal details
- Born: January 26, 1939 (age 87) Ain-Borday, Lebanon
- Occupation: Professor

Cyril Salim Bustros S.M.S.P. (born January 26, 1939) is a Lebanese Melkite Greek Catholic hierarch who has served as Archbishop of Beirut and Byblos since 1988. He previously served as Archbishop of Baalbeck and later as Eparch of Newton. He is a former professor at Saint Joseph University in Beirut.

== Life ==
Archbishop Cyril was born at Ain-Borday, near Baalbek, Lebanon, on January 26, 1939. He is a member of the Bustros family, a prominent clan in Lebanese society.

=== Education ===
After his primary and secondary studies at the Minor Seminary of St. Paul at Harissa, he pursued his philosophical studies at St. Paul Institute in 1956 and 1957, and made his novitiate with the White Fathers in Gap, France. He then studied theology for four years (1958–1962) at the Major Seminary at St. Anne of Jerusalem.

=== Priesthood ===
He was ordained to the priesthood in the Society of the Missionaries of Saint Paul on June 29, 1962. From 1962 to 1970, he was Professor of Classical Greek and of French Literature at the Minor Seminary. Then from 1972-1974 Professor of Philosophy and Theology at St. Paul Institute in Harissa.

Interrupting his teaching, he pursued a Doctorate of Theology at the Catholic University of Louvain in Belgium, and received his degree in 1976. Bustros then served for eleven years as director of the St. Paul Institute of Philosophy and Theology at the Paulist Missionaries at Harissa. During this period he also held an appointment as Professor at Saint Joseph University in Beirut.

=== Episcopate ===
In 1988 the Holy Synod of the Melkite Catholic Church elected him Archbishop of Baalbeck, succeeding Elias Zoghby. He was consecrated to the episcopate on November 27, 1988, in the Basilica of St. Paul in Harissa by Maximos V Hakim, assisted by Archbishops Zoghby and Joseph Raya.

Bustros was appointed to lead the Eparchy of Newton in the United States on June 22, 2004, succeeding John Elya. He was enthroned at Annunciation Melkite Catholic Cathedral on August 18, 2004.

In June 2011 the Holy Synod of the Melkite Church elected Bustros to the Metropolitan See of Beirut. Taking his place as Eparch of the United States was Nicholas Samra.

Bustros is a member of the International Commission for Dialogue between the Catholic Church and the Assyrian Church of the East, and of the Standing Conference of American-Middle Eastern Christian and Muslim Religious Leaders.

He retired on 9 November 2018.

== Distinctions ==
- Grand Prior of the Province of the United States of the Patriarchal Order of the Holy Cross of Jerusalem
