= John Elya =

Lebanese Catholic prelate (1928–2019)

His Grace, The Most Reverend John Adel Elya BS
- Eparchial Bishop of Newton
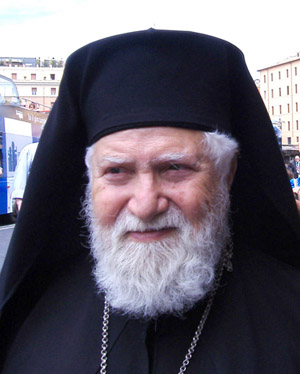
- Church: Melkite Greek Catholic Church
- Diocese: Melkite Greek Catholic Eparchy of Newton
- Installed: 25 January 1994
- Term ended: 22 June 2004
- Predecessor: Ignatius Ghattas
- Successor: Cyril Salim Bustros
- Previous posts: Auxiliary Eparch of Newton; Titular Bishop of Abila Lysaniae

Orders
- Ordination: 17 February 1952
- Consecration: 29 June 1986 by Maximos V Hakim, Joseph Tawil and Michel Hakim

Personal details
- Born: 16 September 1928 Maghdouché, Lebanon
- Died: 19 July 2019 (aged 90) Joun, Lebanon
- Motto: That all may be one

Styles of John Adel Elya, B.S.O.
- Reference style: His Grace; The Most Reverend
- Spoken style: His Grace
- Religious style: Eparch

John Adel Elya, BS (16 September 1928 – 19 July 2019) was a Lebanese Catholic prelate who served as Eparch of Newton in the Melkite Greek Catholic Church from 1993 to 2004. He was a member of the Basilian Salvatorian Order.

== Biography ==
Elya, a native of Maghdouché, Lebanon, entered the Melkite Basilian Salvatorian Order, where he professed his solemn vows in 1949. After completing his philosophical and theological studies, Elya was ordained a priest on 17 February 1952. He later obtained a licentiate in theology from the Pontifical Gregorian University and taught moral theology and philosophy in the Monastery of Saint Savior in Lebanon and served as rector of the seminary of Saint Basil in Methuen, Massachusetts.

Elya went on to serve as a parish priest in Zerka, Jordan. He also served as the pastor of churches in Manchester, New Hampshire, Toronto, Ontario, and Lawrence, Massachusetts, and as rector of the Annunciation Melkite Catholic Cathedral in Roslindale, Massachusetts. While a priest in the United States he earned a master's degree from Boston College.

In 1977 Elya was named an archimandrite. He was appointed titular Bishop of Abilene of Lysanias and auxiliary to the Eparch of Newton. On 25 November 1993 he was appointed Eparch of Newton, succeeding the deceased Bishop Ignatius Ghattas. Elya was installed 25 January 1994, serving as eparch until his retirement on 22 June 2004. He was succeeded as eparch by Archbishop Cyril Salim Bustros.

In 1996, Elya took the notable action of ordaining a married man to the priesthood. The Vatican had taken a restrictive view of ordaining married men to the priesthood in the Eastern Catholic churches of North America. Previously, North American married Melkites had gone overseas for ordination and returned as parish priests. Elya was the first to ordain a married man in the United States. In 2011 the Melkite Eparchy formally announced it was not observing the Vatican restriction of married men in the priesthood and in 2014, Pope Francis ended the prohibition.

== Distinctions ==
- Grand Prior of the Province of the United States of the Patriarchal Order of the Holy Cross of Jerusalem

== See also ==
- Gregory III Laham, current Patriarch
- Joseph Tawil, former eparch
- Melkite Christianity in Lebanon
- Catholic Church hierarchy
- Catholic Church in the United States
- Historical list of the Catholic bishops of the United States
- List of Catholic bishops of the United States
- Lists of patriarchs, archbishops, and bishops

== Episcopal succession ==
Catholic Church titles
Preceded by Ignatius Ghattas	Eparch of Newton; 1994–2004	Succeeded by Cyril Salim Bustros
Preceded by –	Auxiliary Eparch of Newton; 1986–1994	Succeeded by –
