= The Courage to Be Ourselves =

The Courage to Be Ourselves is a Christmas 1970 pastoral letter of Melkite Catholic Archbishop Joseph Tawil of the Eparchy of Newton. The address defines the raison d'être for the existence of diasporate Eastern Catholic Churches and their traditions.

Tawil was appointed archbishop of the Melkite Greek Catholic Church in the United States in 1969. Latin practices, particularly the liturgical latinisation of Eastern Catholic liturgies, had led many Melkite Catholics to abandon their religion. Tawil wrote the pastoral letter to address these concerns.

== The four arguments ==
Archbishop Tawil used the letter to lay out four major points on the current state and future direction of the Melkite Church in America.

- The patrimony of the Melkite Church is rich in heritage and should not be neglected. Quoting from Vatican II, the letter says:

History, tradition, and numerous ecclesiastical institutions manifest luminously how much the universal Church is indebted to the Eastern Churches. Therefore, ... all Eastern rite members should know that they can and should always preserve their lawful liturgical rites and their established way of life ... and should honor all these things with greatest fidelity.

- The Eastern Churches have a special mission to the Church of Rome. Tawil mentioned that the Roman Catholic Church has learned much from the Eastern Churches, stating:

Indeed, the Roman Church, as the Council affirmed, has learned many lessons of late from the East in the fields of liturgy (use of the vernacular, Communion in both kinds, baptism by immersion), of Church order (collegiality, synodal government, the role of the deacon), and spirituality. In a very real sense, the Western Church needs a vibrant Eastern Church to complement its understanding of the Christian message.

- The Eastern Catholic Churches serve as an ecumenical "bridge" between Catholicism and the Orthodox Church. Tawil argued that Latinizing the Eastern Catholic Churches would ultimately block a much hoped-for reunion of Eastern and Western Christianity by demonstrating that a union with Rome would lead to "ecclesiastical assimilation".
- The Melkite faithful living in the diaspora must navigate a course between the twin dangers of what Tawil calls "the ghetto mentality" on the one hand and assimilation. Addressing the facilicy of the ghetto, Tawil argued that the church must be opened up to outsiders:

In a ghetto life is closed in upon itself, operating only within itself, with its own ethnic and social clichés. And the Parish lives upon the ethnic character of the community; when that character disappears, the community dies and the parish dies with it ... One day all our ethnic traits—language, folklore, customs—will have disappeared. Time itself is seeing to this. And so we can not think of our communities as ethnic parishes, primarily for the service of the immigrant or the ethnically oriented, unless we wish to assure the death of our community. Our Churches are not only for our own people but are also for any of our fellow Americans who are attracted to our traditions which show forth the beauty of the universal Church and the variety of its riches. However, he urged that the faithful resist the temptation is to slip into anonymity through assimilation and to hold fast to their religious patrimony.

== Legacy and influence ==
The pastoral letter served as a catalyst for profound changes in the Melkite Church in the United States, and for other Eastern Catholic eparchies located in the West. The most noteworthy effect was the de-Latinization of American churches and a revival of ancient Byzantine traditions. Publication of the letter also facilitated ecumenical movements, including dialogue with the Orthodox Church of Antioch.

In his retirement, Tawil began expanding the pastoral letter into a small book. However, he took ill and died prior to editing and publishing the work.

== See also ==
- Liturgical Latinisation
- Orientalium Ecclesiarum
