= List of cathedrals in the United States =

This is a list of cathedrals in the United States, including both actual cathedrals (seats of bishops in episcopal mainline denominations and evangelical church building with the word "cathedral" in their names.

The United States is, according to some measures, home to the largest cathedral in the world, the Cathedral of St. John the Divine (Episcopal) in New York City.

== Alabama ==
Municipality	Cathedral	Image	Location & References
Birmingham	Cathedral of St. Paul (Roman Catholic)		33°31′01″N 86°48′18″W
Birmingham	Cathedral Church of the Advent (Episcopal)		33°31′9″N 86°48′30″W
Birmingham	Holy Trinity-Holy Cross Cathedral (Greek Orthodox)		33°30′33″N 86°48′12″W
Mobile	Cathedral Basilica of the Immaculate Conception (Roman Catholic)		30°41′24″N 88°02′45″W
Mobile	Christ Church Cathedral (Episcopal)		30°41′22″N 88°02′25″W
Selma	Cathedral of Christ the King (Charismatic Episcopal Church)		32°25′51″N 87°01′18″W

== Alaska ==
Municipality	Cathedral	Image	Location & References
Anchorage	Our Lady of Guadalupe Cathedral (Roman Catholic)		61°11′5.74″N 149°56′38.56″W
Anchorage	Holy Family Old Cathedral (former cathedral) (Roman Catholic)		61°13′02″N 149°53′53″W
Anchorage	St. Innocent Russian Orthodox Cathedral (Orthodox Church in America)		61°13′06″N 149°45′17″W
Eagle River (Anchorage)	St. John Cathedral (Antiochian Orthodox)		61°21′39″N 149°31′48″W
Fairbanks	Sacred Heart Cathedral (Roman Catholic)		64°50′11″N 147°46′50″W
Juneau	Co-Cathedral of the Nativity of the Blessed Virgin Mary (Roman Catholic)		58°18′13″N 134°24′29″W
Kodiak	Holy Resurrection Cathedral (Orthodox Church in America)		57°47′19″N 152°24′09″W
Sitka	St. Michael the Archangel Cathedral (Orthodox Church in America)		57°03′00″N 135°20′06″W
Unalaska	Church of the Holy Ascension (Orthodox Church in America)		53°52′32″N 166°32′10″W

== Arizona ==
Municipality	Cathedral	Image	Location & References
Glendale (Phoenix area)	St. Peter Cathedral (Assyrian Church of the East)		33°38′35″N 112°11′47″W
Phoenix	Cathedral of SS. Simon & Jude (Roman Catholic)		33°31′47″N 112°06′58″W
Phoenix	Trinity Episcopal Cathedral (Episcopal)		33°27′32″N 112°04′31″W
Phoenix	Holy Trinity Cathedral (Greek Orthodox)		33°31′51″N 112°02′21″W
Phoenix	St. Stephen Cathedral (Byzantine Catholic)		33°33′24″N 112°02′52″W
Tucson	St. Augustine's Cathedral (Roman Catholic)		32°13′10″N 110°58′17″W

== Arkansas ==
Municipality	Cathedral	Image	Location & References
Little Rock	St. Andrew's Cathedral (Roman Catholic)		34°44′33″N 92°16′20″W
Little Rock	Trinity Episcopal Cathedral (Episcopal)		34°43′59″N 92°16′36″W

== California ==
Municipality	Cathedral	Image	Location & References
Alhambra (Los Angeles area)	St. Steven's Cathedral (Serbian Orthodox)		34°03′45″N 118°08′53″W
Burbank (Los Angeles area)	St. Leon Cathedral (Armenian Church in America) (Oriental Orthodox Communion)		34°12′22″N 118°20′30″W
Burbank (Los Angeles area)	St. Ephraim Cathedral (Syriac Orthodox) (Oriental Orthodox Communion)		34°11′22″N 118°18′50″W
Daly City (San Francisco area)	St. George's Cathedral (Ecumenical Patriarchate Vicariate for Palestinian-Jordanian Communities)		37°40′33″N 122°28′16″W
El Cajon (San Diego area)	St. Peter's Cathedral (Chaldean Catholic)		32°45′14″N 116°55′27″W
Fresno	St. John's Cathedral (Roman Catholic)		36°44′26″N 119°46′57″W
Fresno	St. James Cathedral (Episcopal Church)		36°47′16″N 119°45′20″W
Garden Grove (Orange County)	Christ Cathedral (Roman Catholic)		33°47′14.63″N 117°53′56.16″W
Glendale (Los Angeles area)	St. Gregory the Illuminator Cathedral (Armenian Catholic)		34°09′54.5″N 118°33′58.4″W
Long Beach (Los Angeles area)	All Saints Anglican Cathedral (Anglican Church in North America)		33°46′10.6″N 118°08′45.9″W
Los Angeles	Cathedral of Our Lady of the Angels (Roman Catholic)		34°3′30″N 118°14′45″W
Los Angeles	St John's Cathedral (Episcopal)		34°01′39″N 118°16′32″W
Los Angeles	St. Sophia Cathedral (Greek Orthodox)		34°02′45″N 118°17′58″W
Los Angeles	Our Lady of Mt. Lebanon-St. Peter Cathedral (Maronite Catholic)		34°04′21″N 118°22′39″W
Los Angeles	St. Anne Melkite Greek Catholic Cathedral (Melkite Greek Catholic Church)		34°09′02″N 118°22′32″W
Los Angeles	Holy Virgin Mary Russian Orthodox Cathedral (Orthodox Church in America)		34°04′50″N 118°16′47″W
Los Angeles	St Nicholas Cathedral (Antiochian Orthodox)		34.063671°N 118.275219°W
Los Angeles	Holy Transfiguration Cathedral (Russian Orthodox Church Outside Russia)		34°05′43″N 118°18′29″W
Los Angeles	Pro-Cathedral of St. Vladimir (Ukrainian Orthodox Church of the USA)		34°05′02″N 118°17′17″W
Los Angeles	St Mary's Byzantine Catholic Proto-Cathedral (Byzantine Catholic)		34°10′02″N 118°28′01″W
Los Angeles	Church of Our Saviour and the Holy Apostles Pro-Cathedral (Anglican Province of Christ the King)		34°03′32″N 118°22′06″W
Modesto	Mar Zaia Cathedral (Assyrian Church of the East)		37°41′47″N 120°58′21″W
Montebello (Los Angeles area)	Holy Cross Cathedral (Armenian Apostolic Church) (Oriental Orthodox Communion)		34°01′17″N 118°06′22″W
Monterey	Cathedral of San Carlos Borromeo (Roman Catholic)		36°35′45″N 121°53′28″W
Oakland	Cathedral of Christ the Light (Roman Catholic)		37°48′38″N 122°15′47″W
Oakland	Ascension Cathedral (Greek Orthodox)		37°48′34″N 122°12′04″W
Sacramento	Blessed Sacrament Cathedral (Roman Catholic)		38°34′44″N 121°29′32″W
Sacramento	Trinity Cathedral (Episcopal)		38°34′14″N 121°28′21″W
San Bernardino	Our Lady of the Rosary Cathedral (Roman Catholic)		34°08′20″N 117°17′22″W
San Diego	St Joseph Cathedral (Roman Catholic)		32°43′18″N 117°09′42″W
San Diego	St. Paul's Cathedral (Episcopal)		32°44′01″N 117°09′36″W
San Francisco	Cathedral of St. Mary of the Assumption (Roman Catholic)		37°47′03″N 122°25′31″W
San Francisco	Old Saint Mary's Cathedral (Roman Catholic)		37°47′34″N 122°24′21″W
San Francisco	Grace Cathedral (Episcopal)		37°47′31″N 122°24′47″W
San Francisco	Annunciation Cathedral (Greek Orthodox)		37°46′08″N 122°25′18″W
San Francisco	Holy Trinity Orthodox Cathedral (Orthodox Church in America)		37°47′52″N 122°25′27″W
San Francisco	Holy Virgin Cathedral (Russian Orthodox Church Outside Russia)		37°46′49″N 122°29′10″W
San Francisco	St. Nicholas Cathedral (Russian Orthodox Patriarchate of Moscow)		37°45′57″N 122°25′45″W
San Jose	Cathedral Basilica of St. Joseph (Roman Catholic)		37°20′03″N 121°53′27″W
San Jose	Trinity Cathedral (Episcopal)		37°20′16″N 121°53′27″W
Santa Rosa	Cathedral of St. Eugene (Roman Catholic)		38°26′50″N 122°41′16″W
Stockton	Cathedral of the Annunciation (Roman Catholic)		37°57′47″N 121°17′59″W

== Colorado ==
Municipality	Cathedral	Image	Location & References
Colorado Springs	St. Mary's Cathedral (Roman Catholic)		38°50′11″N 104°49′36″W
Denver	Cathedral Basilica of the Immaculate Conception (Roman Catholic)		39°44′25″N 104°58′55″W
Denver	Cathedral of St. John in the Wilderness (Episcopal)		39°44′17″N 104°58′41″W
Denver	Assumption of the Theotokos Cathedral (Greek Orthodox)		39°42′38″N 104°55′56″W
Pueblo	Sacred Heart Cathedral (Roman Catholic)		38°16′37″N 104°36′43″W

== Connecticut ==
Municipality	Cathedral	Image	Location & References
Bridgeport	St. Augustine Cathedral (Roman Catholic)		41°10′49″N 73°11′45″W
Hartford	St. Joseph's Cathedral (Roman Catholic)		41°46′04″N 72°41′35″W
Hartford	Christ Church Cathedral (Episcopal)		41°46′06″N 72°40′27″W
Hartford	St. George Cathedral (Greek Orthodox)		41°43′40″N 72°41′31″W
Norwich	St. Patrick's Cathedral (Roman Catholic)		41°31′52″N 72°04′38″W
Stamford	St. Vladimir's Cathedral (Ukrainian Catholic)		41°03′42″N 73°31′40″W

== Delaware ==
Municipality	Cathedral	Image	Location & References
Wilmington	Cathedral of Saint Peter (Roman Catholic)		39°44′35″N 75°33′12″W

== District of Columbia ==
Municipality	Cathedral	Image	Location & References
Washington	Cathedral of St. Matthew the Apostle (Roman Catholic)		38°54′23″N 77°02′25″W
Washington	Washington National Cathedral (Episcopal)		38°55′50″N 77°04′15″W
Washington	St. Nicholas Cathedral (Orthodox Church in America)		38°55′30″N 77°04′07″W
Washington	St. Sophia Cathedral (Greek Orthodox)		38°55′39″N 77°04′13″W
Washington	St. John the Baptist Cathedral (Russian Orthodox Church Outside Russia)		38°56′24″N 77°02′16″W

== Florida ==
Municipality	Cathedral	Image	Location & References
Coral Gables (Miami area)	St. George Cathedral (Antiochian Orthodox)		25°44′43″N 80°15′41″W
Jacksonville	St. John's Cathedral (Episcopal)		30°19′44″N 81°39′12″W
Miami	St. Mary's Cathedral (Roman Catholic)		25°50′38″N 80°12′01″W
Miami	Trinity Cathedral (Episcopal)		25°47′25″N 80°11′12″W
Miami	St. Sophia Cathedral (Greek Orthodox)		25°45′22″N 80°12′23″W
Miami	St. Peter's Cathedral (African Orthodox) (not in communion with the Ecumenical Patriarch)		25°49′14″N 80°11′59″W
Miami Lakes (Miami area)	Christ the Saviour Cathedral (Orthodox Church in America)		25°55′27″N 80°19′30″W
Miramar (Miami area)	Resurrection Cathedral (Charismatic Episcopal Church)		25°59′18″N 80°13′18″W
Orlando	St. James Cathedral (Roman Catholic)		28°32′42″N 81°22′43″W
Orlando	St. Luke's Cathedral (Episcopal)		28°32′40″N 81°22′40″W
Orlando	Cathedral of St. Dismas (Charismatic Episcopal Church)		28°34′09″N 81°25′48″W
Oviedo (Orlando area)	St. Alban's Cathedral (Anglican Province of America)		28°37′09″N 81°15′19″W
Palm Beach Gardens	St. Ignatius Loyola Cathedral (Roman Catholic)		26°49′23″N 80°06′25″W
Pensacola	Sacred Heart Cathedral (Roman Catholic)		30°25′56″N 87°12′15″W
St. Augustine	Cathedral Basilica of St. Augustine (Roman Catholic)		29°53′35″N 81°18′45″W
St. Petersburg	St. Jude the Apostle Cathedral (Roman Catholic)		27°46′40″N 82°42′48″W
St. Petersburg	St. Peter's Cathedral (Episcopal)		27°46′24″N 82°38′20″W
Tallahassee	St. Thomas More Co-Cathedral (Roman Catholic)		30°26′48″N 84°17′52″W
Tallahassee	St. Peter's Cathedral (Anglican)		30°32′02″N 84°14′00″W
Tampa	Cathedral of Jesus of Nazareth (Philippine Independent Church)		28°04′40″N 82°28′05″W
Tarpon Springs	St. Nicholas Greek Orthodox Cathedral (Greek Orthodox)		28°08′49″N 82°45′23″W
Venice	Epiphany Cathedral (Roman Catholic)		27°06′04″N 82°26′56″W

== Georgia ==
Municipality	Cathedral	Image	Location & References
Atlanta	Cathedral of Christ the King (Roman Catholic)		33°49′41.271″N 84°23′11.3418″W
Atlanta	Cathedral of St. Philip (Episcopal)		33°49′52″N 84°23′12″W
Atlanta	Annunciation Cathedral (Greek Orthodox)		33°49′42″N 84°18′32″W
Columbus	St. George's Cathedral (Anglican Catholic Church)		
Lithonia (Atlanta area)	Kidist Marian Cathedral (Ethiopian Orthodox) (Oriental Orthodox Communion)		33°45′41″N 84°09′45″W
Loganville (Atlanta area)	Holy Cross Cathedral (Anglican Church in North America)		33°51′08″N 83°54′56″W
Savannah	Cathedral Basilica of St. John the Baptist (Roman Catholic)		32°04′24″N 81°05′29″W
Sharpsburg	Cathedral of Christ the King (Charismatic Episcopal Church)		33°24′02″N 84°37′53″W

== Hawaii ==
Municipality	Cathedral	Image	Location & References
Honolulu	Cathedral Basilica of Our Lady of Peace (Roman Catholic)		21°18′38.7″N 157°51′33.9″W
Honolulu	Co-Cathedral of Saint Theresa of the Child Jesus (Roman Catholic)		21°19′27.26″N 157°51′39.81″W
Honolulu	Cathedral Church of Saint Andrew (Episcopal)		21°18′35″N 157°51′26″W
Honolulu	Ss. Constantine & Helen Greek Orthodox Cathedral of the Pacific (Greek Orthodox)		21°18′20″N 157°50′51″W

== Idaho ==
Municipality	Cathedral	Image	Location & References
Boise	Cathedral of St. John the Evangelist (Roman Catholic)		43°37′17.0034″N 116°11′54.4194″W
Boise	St. Michael's Cathedral (Episcopal)		43°37′7.593″N 116°11′0″W

== Illinois ==
Municipality	Cathedral	Image	Location & References
Belleville	St. Peter's Cathedral (Roman Catholic)		38°30′37″N 89°59′16″W
Bellwood (Chicago area)	Mar Thoma Shleeha Cathedral (Syro-Malabar Catholic)		41°53′21″N 87°53′40″W
Bellwood (Chicago area)	Saint Gregorios Cathedral (Malankara Orthodox Church) (Oriental Orthodox Communion)		41°53′13″N 87°51′58″W
Chicago	Holy Name Cathedral (Roman Catholic)		41°53′46″N 87°37′40″W
Chicago	St. James Cathedral (Episcopal)		41°53′41″N 87°37′36″W
Chicago	Annunciation Cathedral (Greek Orthodox)		41°54′04″N 87°37′57″W
Chicago	St. Nicholas Cathedral (Ukrainian Catholic)		41°53′49″N 87°41′02″W
Chicago	Holy Trinity Cathedral (Orthodox Church in America)		41°54′07″N 87°40′55″W
Chicago	St. George Cathedral (Orthodox Church in America)		41°53′54″N 87°40′19″W
Chicago	Holy Resurrection Cathedral (Serbian Orthodox)		41°59′01″N 87°49′40″W
Chicago	Ss. Constantine and Helen Orthodox Cathedral (Romanian Orthodox)		41°58′44″N 87°48′00″W
Chicago	Mar Gewargis (St. George) Cathedral (Assyrian Church of the East)		42°00′47″N 87°40′11″W
Chicago	St. Volodymyr Cathedral (Ukrainian Orthodox Church of the USA)		41°54′02″N 87°41′03″W
Chicago	All Saints Cathedral (Polish National Catholic Church) (not in full communion with Rome)		41°59′17″N 87°51′12″W
Des Plaines (Chicago area)	Holy Virgin Protection Cathedral (Russian Orthodox Church Outside Russia)		42°01′11″N 87°53′44″W
Joliet	Cathedral of St. Raymond Nonnatus (Roman Catholic)		41°32′06″N 88°06′04″W
Peoria	Cathedral of Saint Mary of the Immaculate Conception (Roman Catholic)		40°41′55″N 89°35′06″W
Quincy	St. John's Cathedral (Anglican Church in America)		39°53′48″N 91°21′20″W
Quincy	St. John's Cathedral (Anglican Church in North America)		39°56′01″N 91°24′16″W
Rockford	Cathedral of St. Peter (Roman Catholic)		42°17′06″N 89°04′58″W
Springfield	Cathedral of the Immaculate Conception (Roman Catholic)		39°47′36″N 89°38′55″W
Springfield	Cathedral Church of St. Paul (Episcopal)		39°47′37″N 89°39′13″W
Wheaton (Chicago area)	Church of the Resurrection (Anglican Church in North America)		41°52′08″S 88°07′16″W

== Indiana ==
Municipality	Cathedral	Image	Location & References
Crown Point	Saints Peter and Paul Cathedral (Macedonian Orthodox)		41°26′34″N 87°20′11″W
Evansville	St. Benedict's Cathedral (Roman Catholic)		37°58′13″N 87°32′27″W
Fort Wayne	Cathedral of the Immaculate Conception (Roman Catholic)		41°04′33″N 85°08′16″W
Gary	Cathedral of the Holy Angels (Roman Catholic)		41°35′56″N 87°20′55″W
Hammond	Pro-Cathedral of St. Michael (Ukrainian Orthodox Church of the United States)		41°35′06″N 87°29′59″W
Indianapolis	Saints Peter and Paul Cathedral (Roman Catholic)		39°47′07″N 86°09′26″W
Indianapolis	Christ Church Cathedral (Episcopal)		39°46′09″N 86°09′27″W
Indianapolis	Cathedral Church of St. Edward the Confessor (Anglican Catholic Church)		39°52′24″N 86°07′19″W
Lafayette	Cathedral of St. Mary of the Immaculate Conception (Roman Catholic)		40°25′05″N 86°53′02″W
Merrillville (Chicago/Gary)	Saints Constantine & Helen Cathedral (Greek Orthodox)		41°28′28″N 87°20′30″W
Merrillville (Chicago/Gary)	St. Elijah Cathedral (Serbian Orthodox)		41°27′32″N 87°21′56″W
South Bend	St. Matthew Cathedral (Roman Catholic)		41°39′23″N 86°14′06″W
South Bend	Cathedral of St. James (Episcopal)		41°40′37″N 86°15′14″W
Vincennes	Basilica of St. Francis Xavier (Old Cathedral) (Roman Catholic)		38°40′44″N 87°32′03″W

== Iowa ==
Municipality	Cathedral	Image	Location & References
Davenport	Sacred Heart Cathedral (Roman Catholic)		41°31′49″N 90°34′08″W
Davenport	Trinity Cathedral (Episcopal)		41°31′52″N 90°34′28″W
Des Moines	St. Ambrose Cathedral (Roman Catholic)		41°35′19″N 93°37′32″W
Des Moines	Cathedral Church of St. Paul (Episcopal)		41°35′17″N 93°37′44″W
Dubuque	St. Raphael's Cathedral (Roman Catholic)		42°29′41″N 90°40′03″W
Sioux City	Cathedral of the Epiphany (Roman Catholic)		42°30′02″N 96°24′23″W

== Kansas ==
Municipality	Cathedral	Image	Location & References
Dodge City	Cathedral of Our Lady of Guadalupe (Roman Catholic)		37°47′36″N 100°02′05″W
Kansas City	Cathedral of St. Peter (Roman Catholic)		39°06′36″N 94°38′43″W
Olathe (Kansas City)	Cathedral Church of the King (Charismatic Episcopal Church)		38°53′33″N 94°48′52″W
Salina	Sacred Heart Cathedral (Roman Catholic)		38°50′28″N 97°36′43″W
Salina	Christ Cathedral (Episcopal)		38°50′21″N 97°36′43″W
Topeka	Grace Cathedral (Episcopal)		39°03′03″N 95°41′02″W
Wichita	Cathedral of the Immaculate Conception (Roman Catholic)		37°41′35″N 97°20′07″W
Wichita	St. George's Cathedral (Antiochian Orthodox)		37°42′30″N 97°15′02″W

== Kentucky ==
Municipality	Cathedral	Image	Location & References
Bardstown	Basilica of St. Joseph Proto-Cathedral (Roman Catholic)		37°48′36″N 85°28′14″W
Covington	Cathedral Basilica of the Assumption (Roman Catholic)		39°04′42″N 84°30′30″W
Lexington	Cathedral of Christ the King (Roman Catholic)		38°02′55″N 84°29′49″W
Lexington	Christ Church Cathedral (Episcopal)		38°01′20″N 84°29′14″W
Louisville	Cathedral of the Assumption (Roman Catholic)		38°15′07″N 85°45′32″W
Louisville	Christ Church Cathedral (Episcopal)		38°15′07″N 85°45′14″W
Owensboro	St. Stephen's Cathedral (Roman Catholic)		37°46′10″N 87°06′55″W

== Louisiana ==
Municipality	Cathedral	Image	Location & References
Alexandria	St. Francis Xavier Cathedral (Roman Catholic)		31°18′44″N 92°26′52″W
Baton Rouge	St. Joseph Cathedral (Roman Catholic)		30°27′06″N 91°11′11″W
Houma	Cathedral of St. Francis de Sales (Roman Catholic)		29°35′43″N 90°43′21″W
Lafayette	St. John the Evangelist Cathedral (Roman Catholic)		30°13′21″N 92°01′26″W
Lake Charles	Cathedral of the Immaculate Conception (Roman Catholic)		30°13′35″N 93°13′00″W
Natchitoches	Basilica of the Immaculate Conception (former cathedral) (Roman Catholic)		31°45′40″N 93°05′15″W
New Orleans	St. Louis Cathedral (Roman Catholic)		29°57′29″N 90°03′50″W
New Orleans	Christ Church Cathedral (Episcopal)		29°55′49″N 90°05′16″W
New Orleans	Holy Trinity Cathedral (Greek Orthodox)		30°01′13″N 90°04′57″W
Shreveport	Cathedral of St. John Berchmans (Roman Catholic)		32°29′51″N 93°45′04″W
Shreveport	St. Mark's Cathedral (Episcopal)		32°28′58″N 93°44′57″W
Thibodeaux	St. Joseph Co-Cathedral (Roman Catholic)		29°47′35″N 90°49′11″W

== Maine ==
Municipality	Cathedral	Image	Location & References
Portland	Cathedral of the Immaculate Conception (Roman Catholic)		43°39′41″N 70°15′17″W
Portland	Cathedral Church of St. Luke (Episcopal)		43°39′08″N 70°15′52″W

== Maryland ==
Municipality	Cathedral	Image	Location & References
Baltimore	Cathedral of Mary Our Queen (Roman Catholic)		39°21′31″N 76°37′34″W
Baltimore	Basilica of the National Shrine of the Assumption of the Blessed Virgin Mary (co-cathedral) (Roman Catholic)		39°17′40″N 76°36′58″W
Baltimore	Cathedral of the Incarnation (Episcopal)		39°19′56″N 76°37′00″W
Baltimore	Cathedral of the Annunciation (Greek Orthodox)		39°18′16″N 76°37′04″W
Bel Air	Cathedral Church of Reconciliation (Charismatic Episcopal Church)		39°32′14″N 76°21′08″W
Easton	Trinity Cathedral (Episcopal)		38°46′34″N 76°04′14″W
Silver Spring	St. Andrew Cathedral (Ukrainian Orthodox Church of the USA)		39°06′14″N 77°00′18″W

== Massachusetts ==
Municipality	Cathedral	Image	Location & References
Amesbury	All Saints Cathedral (Anglican Church in North America)		42°51′22″N 70°56′05″W
Boston	Cathedral of the Holy Cross (Roman Catholic)		42°20′26″N 71°04′11″W
Boston	Cathedral Church of St. Paul (Episcopal)		42°21′21″N 71°03′45″W
Boston	Annunciation Melkite Catholic Cathedral (Melkite Greek Catholic Church)		42°17′51″N 71°08′04″W
Boston	Annunciation Greek Orthodox Cathedral (Greek Orthodox)		42°20′12″N 71°05′37″W
Boston	Holy Trinity Cathedral (Orthodox Church in America)		42°20′28″N 71°05′56″W
Boston	Saint George Albanian Orthodox Cathedral (Orthodox Church in America)		42°20′07″N 71°02′37″W
Fall River	St. Mary's Cathedral (Roman Catholic)		42°17′19″N 71°07′58″W
Springfield	St. Michael's Cathedral (Roman Catholic)		42°06′15″N 72°35′04″W
Springfield	Christ Church Cathedral (Episcopal)		42°06′12″N 72°35′09″W
Springfield	St. George Cathedral (Greek Orthodox)		42°06′39″N 72°36′11″W
Westwood	Saint Mark of Ephesus Cathedral (Eparchial Synod of the Church of the Genuine Orthodox Christians of America)		42°12′50″N 71°12′48″W
Worcester	Cathedral of St. Paul (Roman Catholic)		42°15′42″N 71°48′17″W
Worcester	St. Spyridon Cathedral (Greek Orthodox)		42°15′59″N 71°48′54″W
Worcester	St. George Cathedral (Antiochian Orthodox)		42°15′58″N 71°45′28″W

== Michigan ==
Municipality	Cathedral	Image	Location & References
Detroit	Cathedral of the Most Blessed Sacrament (Roman Catholic)		42°23′19″N 83°05′04″W
Detroit	Cathedral Church of St. Paul (Episcopal)		42°21′22″N 83°03′50″W
Detroit	Annunciation Cathedral (Greek Orthodox)		42°20′08″N 83°02′20″W
Detroit	SS. Peter and Paul Cathedral (Orthodox Church in America)		42°19′43″N 83°07′12″W
Detroit	St. Lazarus Cathedral 'Ravanica' (Serbian Orthodox)		42°26′31″N 83°01′21″W
Farmington Hills (Detroit area)	St. Thoma Cathedral (Syriac Catholic Church)		42°28′57″N 83°23′54″W
Ferndale (Detroit area)	Dormition Cathedral (Russian Orthodox Church Outside Russia)		42°27′49″N 83°08′37″W
Gaylord	St. Mary, Our Lady of Mount Carmel Cathedral (Roman Catholic)		45°02′01″N 84°41′00″W
Grand Rapids	Cathedral of St. Andrew (Roman Catholic)		42°57′29″N 85°40′02″W
Kalamazoo	St. Augustine Cathedral (Roman Catholic)		42°17′30″N 85°35′29″W
Kalamazoo	Cathedral of Christ the King (former cathedral) (Episcopal)		42°14′23″N 85°37′17″W
Lansing	St. Mary Cathedral (Roman Catholic)		42°44′08″N 84°33′22″W
Marquette	St. Peter Cathedral (Roman Catholic)		46°32′28″N 87°23′56″W
Saginaw	Cathedral of Mary of the Assumption (Roman Catholic)		43°25′32″N 83°56′12″W
Sault Sainte Marie	Holy Name of Mary Proto-Cathedral (Roman Catholic)		46°29′55″N 84°20′29″W
Southfield (Detroit area)	Mother of God Cathedral (Chaldean Catholic)		42°28′34″N 83°16′47″W
Southfield (Detroit area)	St. George Romanian Orthodox Cathedral (Romanian Orthodox Episcopate of America)		42°27′28″N 83°13′28″W
Southfield (Detroit area)	St. Mary the Protectress Cathedral (Ukrainian Orthodox Church of the USA)		42°27′12″N 83°14′24″W

== Minnesota ==
Municipality	Cathedral	Image	Location & References
Crookston	Cathedral of the Immaculate Conception (Roman Catholic)		47°46′30″N 96°35′25″W
Duluth	Cathedral of Our Lady of the Rosary (Roman Catholic)		46°48′58″N 92°04′01″W
Faribault	Cathedral of Our Merciful Saviour (Episcopal)		44°17′49″N 93°16′16″W
Minneapolis	Co-Cathedral Basilica of St. Mary (Roman Catholic)		44°58′23″N 93°17′09″W
Minneapolis	St. Mark's Episcopal Cathedral (Episcopal)		44°58′05″N 93°17′14″W
Minneapolis	St. Mary's Cathedral (Orthodox Church in America)		45°00′18″N 93°15′35″W
New Ulm	Cathedral of the Holy Trinity (Roman Catholic)		44°19′05″N 94°28′06″W
Rochester	Co-Cathedral of St. John the Evangelist (Roman Catholic)		44°01′23″N 92°28′07″W
St. Cloud	St. Mary's Cathedral (Roman Catholic)		45°33′31″N 94°09′40″W
St. Paul	Cathedral of Saint Paul, National Shrine of the Apostle Paul (Roman Catholic)		44°56′49″N 93°06′32″W
Winona	Cathedral of the Sacred Heart (Roman Catholic)		44°02′54″N 91°38′22″W

== Mississippi ==
Municipality	Cathedral	Image	Location & References
Biloxi	Cathedral of the Nativity of the Blessed Virgin Mary (Roman Catholic)		30°23′49″N 88°53′28″W
Jackson	Cathedral of St. Peter the Apostle (Roman Catholic)		32°18′04″N 90°11′03″W
Jackson	St. Andrew's Cathedral (Episcopal)		32°17′57″N 90°11′02″W
Natchez	St. Mary Basilica (former cathedral) (Roman Catholic)		31°33′31″N 91°24′04″W

== Missouri ==
Municipality	Cathedral	Image	Location & References
Cape Girardeau	Cathedral of St. Mary of the Annunciation (Roman Catholic)		37°18′04″N 89°31′35″W
Jefferson City	Cathedral of Saint Joseph (Roman Catholic)		38°35′30″N 92°12′37″W
Kansas City	Cathedral of the Immaculate Conception (Roman Catholic)		39°06′03″N 94°35′21″W
Kansas City	Grace and Holy Trinity Cathedral (Episcopal)		39°05′55″N 94°35′19″W
St. Joseph	Cathedral of St. Joseph (Roman Catholic)		39°46′15″N 94°50′53″W
St. Louis	Cathedral Basilica of Saint Louis (The New Cathedral) (Roman Catholic)		38°38′33″N 90°15′17″W
St. Louis	Basilica of St. Louis, King of France (The Old Cathedral) (Roman Catholic)		38°37′27″N 90°11′14″W
St. Louis	Christ Church Cathedral (Episcopal)		38°37′50″N 90°11′54″W
St. Louis	St. Raymond's Cathedral (Maronite Catholic)		38°37′02″N 90°11′56″W
Springfield	St. Agnes Cathedral (Roman Catholic)		37°12′15″N 93°17′24″W

== Montana ==
Municipality	Cathedral	Image	Location & References
Billings	St. Patrick's Co-Cathedral (Roman Catholic)		45°46′55″N 108°30′40″W
Great Falls	St. Ann's Cathedral (Roman Catholic)		47°30′31″N 111°17′43″W
Helena	Cathedral of Saint Helena (Roman Catholic)		46°35′25″N 112°01′57″W
Helena	St. Peter's Cathedral (Episcopal)		46°35′33″N 112°02′23″W

== Nebraska ==
Municipality	Cathedral	Image	Location & References
Grand Island	Cathedral of the Nativity of the Blessed Virgin Mary (Roman Catholic)		40°55′16″N 98°20′32″W
Hastings	St. Mark's Pro-Cathedral (Episcopal)		40°35′16″N 98°23′31″W
Lincoln	Cathedral of the Risen Christ (Roman Catholic)		40°46′49″N 96°40′12″W
Omaha	St. Cecilia Cathedral (Roman Catholic)		41°15′59″N 95°58′18″W
Omaha	Trinity Cathedral (Episcopal)		41°15′37″N 95°56′21″W

== Nevada ==
Municipality	Cathedral	Image	Location & References
Las Vegas	Guardian Angel Cathedral (Roman Catholic)		36°07′50″N 115°09′49″W
Las Vegas	Saint Michael Cathedral (Antiochian Orthodox)		36°04′29″N 115°13′46″W
Reno	St. Thomas Aquinas Cathedral (Roman Catholic)		39°31′34″N 119°49′02″W
Reno	Trinity Episcopal Cathedral (Episcopal)		39°31′25″N 119°48′53″W

== New Hampshire ==
Municipality	Cathedral	Image	Location & References
Manchester	Cathedral of St. Joseph (Roman Catholic)		42°59′36″N 71°27′32″W
Manchester	Holy Trinity Cathedral (Polish National Catholic Church) (not in full communion with Rome)		42°59′47″N 71°27′28″W
Manchester	St. George Cathedral (Greek Orthodox)		42°59′24″N 71°26′12″W

== New Jersey ==
Municipality	Cathedral	Image	Location & References
Camden	Cathedral of the Immaculate Conception (Roman Catholic)		39°56′41″N 75°07′08″W
Camden	St. Joseph Pro-Cathedral (Roman Catholic)		39°56′51″N 75°05′02″W
Carteret	St. Demetrius Cathedral (Ukrainian Orthodox Church of the USA)		40°35′03″N 74°13′14″W
Freehold	Co-Cathedral of St. Robert Bellarmine (Roman Catholic)		40°12′55″N 74°17′34″W
Howell	St. Alexander Nevsky Cathedral (Russian Orthodox Church Outside Russia)		40°06′56″N 74°12′59″W
Metuchen	St. Francis of Assisi Cathedral (Roman Catholic)		40°32′44″N 74°21′47″W
Newark	Cathedral Basilica of the Sacred Heart (Roman Catholic)		40°45′18″N 74°10′42″W
Newark	St. Patrick's Pro-Cathedral (Roman Catholic)		40°44′31″N 74°10′20″W
Newark	Trinity & St. Philip's Cathedral (Episcopal)		40°44′31″N 74°10′20″W
Old Tappan	St. Ephrem Cathedral (Malankara Orthodox Syrian Church) (Oriental Orthodox Communion)		41°00′49″N 73°59′05″W
Paramus	St. Mark's Cathedral (Syriac Orthodox) (Oriental Orthodox Communion)		40°57′12″N 74°04′37″W
Passaic	Cathedral of St. Michael the Archangel (Byzantine Catholic)		40°51′54″N 74°07′03″W
Passaic	Saints Peter & Paul Russian Orthodox Cathedral (Russian Orthodox Church in the USA, Moscow Patriarchate)		40°52′07″N 74°06′58″W
Paterson	Cathedral of St. John the Baptist (Roman Catholic)		40°54′46″N 74°10′21″W
Paterson	St. Michael's Cathedral (Russian Orthodox Church Outside Russia)		40°55′12″N 74°11′08″W
Tenafly	Cathedral of St. John the Theologian (Greek Orthodox)		40°54′45″N 73°56′53″W
Trenton	Cathedral of St. Mary of the Assumption (Roman Catholic)		40°13′22″N 74°45′58″W
Trenton	Trinity Cathedral (Episcopal)		40°13′47″N 74°47′14″W
Trenton	Cathedral of the Holy Assumption (Russian True Orthodox Church Abroad) (not in communion with the Ecumenical Patriarch)		40°13′03″N 74°45′43″W

== New Mexico ==
Municipality	Cathedral	Image	Location & References
Albuquerque	Cathedral of St. John (Episcopal)		35°04′56″N 106°39′06″W
Gallup	Sacred Heart Cathedral (Roman Catholic)		35°31′30″N 108°44′10″W
Las Cruces	Cathedral of the Immaculate Heart of Mary (Roman Catholic)		32°17′58″N 106°45′57″W
Santa Fe	Cathedral Basilica of Saint Francis of Assisi (Roman Catholic)		35°41′11″N 105°56′11″W

== New York ==
Municipality	Cathedral	Image	Location & references
Albany	Cathedral of the Immaculate Conception (Roman Catholic)		42°38′51″N 73°45′35″W
Albany	Cathedral of All Saints (Episcopal)		42°39′17″N 73°45′28″W
Buffalo	St. Joseph Cathedral (Roman Catholic)		42°52′58″N 78°52′41″W
Buffalo	St. Paul's Cathedral (Episcopal)		42°52′59″N 78°52′34″W
Elmont	St. Vincent de Paul Cathedral (Syro-Malankara Catholic Church)		40°42′36″N 73°41′48″W
Garden City	Cathedral of the Incarnation (Episcopal)		40°43′16″N 73°38′32″W
Hempstead	Cathedral of St. Paul (Greek Orthodox)		40°42′37″N 73°38′04″W
Jordanville	Holy Trinity Cathedral (Russian Orthodox Church Outside Russia)		42°55′38″N 74°56′04″W
Lancaster	Holy Mother of the Rosary Cathedral (Polish National Catholic Church) (not in full communion with Rome)		42°53′32″N 78°35′55″W
Malverne	Cathedral Church of the Intercessor (Charismatic Episcopal Church)		40°40′34″N 73°40′15″W
New Paltz	Cathedral of Christ the King (Charismatic Episcopal Church)		41°42′28″N 74°05′34″W
New York (Manhattan)	St. Patrick's Cathedral (Roman Catholic)		40°45′31″N 73°58′35″W
New York (Manhattan)	Basilica of St. Patrick's Old Cathedral (Roman Catholic)		40°43′25″N 73°59′44″W
New York (Manhattan)	Cathedral of St. John the Divine (Episcopal)		40°48′13″N 73°57′41″W
New York (Manhattan)	Cathedral of the Holy Trinity (Greek Orthodox)		40°46′11″N 73°57′22″W
New York (Manhattan)	Cathedral of the Holy Virgin Protection (Orthodox Church in America)		40°43′28″N 73°59′22″W
New York (Manhattan)	St. Ann's Cathedral (former cathedral) (Armenian Catholic)		40°43′56″N 73°59′21″W
New York (Manhattan)	St. Vartan Cathedral (Armenian Church in America) (Oriental Orthodox Communion)		40°44′42″N 73°58′31″W
New York (Manhattan)	Saint Illuminator's Cathedral (Armenian Apostolic Church) (Oriental Orthodox Communion)		40°44′28″N 73°58′48″W
New York (Manhattan)	Cathedral of the Theotokos of the Sign (Russian Orthodox Church Outside of Russia)		40°47′05″N 73°57′14″W
New York (Manhattan)	St. Nicholas Cathedral (Russian Orthodox Patriarchate of Moscow)		40°47′18″N 73°57′15″W
New York (Manhattan)	Cathedral of St. Sava (Serbian Orthodox) (destroyed by fire, 2016)		40°44′37″N 73°59′25″W
New York (Manhattan)	Saints Kiril & Metodij Cathedral (Bulgarian Orthodox)		40°45′56″N 73°59′39″W
New York (Manhattan)	Holy Cross Pro-Cathedral (African Orthodox) (not in communion with the Ecumenical Patriarch)		40°48′38″N 73°56′41″W
New York (Manhattan)	Cathedral Church of St. Thomas the Apostle (Liberal Catholic Church International) (not in communion with Rome)		40°49′15″N 73°56′20″W
New York (Brooklyn)	Cathedral Basilica of St. James (Roman Catholic)		40°41′49″N 73°59′12″W
New York (Brooklyn)	Co-Cathedral of St. Joseph (Roman Catholic)		40°40′50″N 73°57′59″W
New York (Brooklyn)	Sts. Constantine and Helen Cathedral (Greek Orthodox)		40°41′26″N 73°59′28″W
New York (Brooklyn)	Cathedral of the Transfiguration of Our Lord (Orthodox Church in America)		40°43′10″N 73°57′13″W
New York (Brooklyn)	St. John the Forerunner Orthodox Cathedral (Russian Orthodox Church Outside Russia)		40°35′10″N 73°56′55″W
New York (Brooklyn)	Our Lady of Lebanon Cathedral (Maronite Catholic)		40°41′39″N 73°59′39″W
New York (Brooklyn)	St. Nicholas Antiochian Orthodox Cathedral, New York (Antiochian Orthodox)		40°41′16″N 73°59′05″W
New York (Brooklyn)	Holy Trinity Cathedral (Ukrainian Orthodox Church of the USA)		40°42′38″N 73°57′40″W
New York (Brooklyn)	St. Ann's Armenian Catholic Cathedral (former cathedral) (Armenian Catholic)		40°43′01″N 73°57′27″W
New York (Brooklyn)	St. Cyril's of Turau Cathedral (Belarusian Orthodox) (not in communion with the Ecumenical Patriarch)		40°41′14″N 73°59′04″W
New York (Queens)	St. Demetrios Cathedral (Greek Orthodox)		40°45′56″N 73°55′22″W
New York (Queens)	Cathedral of Saint Markella (Genuine Orthodox Church of America) (not in communion with the Ecumenical Patriarch)		40°46′50″N 73°54′38″W
Niagara Falls	St. George's Cathedral Church (Independent Anglican Church - Canada Synod)		
Ogdensburg	St. Mary's Cathedral (Roman Catholic)		44°41′56″N 75°29′08″W
Poughkeepsie	Church of the Holy Comforter (Holy Orthodox Catholic and Apostolic Church of America)		
Rochester	Sacred Heart Cathedral (Roman Catholic)		43°11′35″N 77°37′58″W
Rockville Centre	St. Agnes Cathedral (Roman Catholic)		40°39′35″N 73°38′47″W
Syracuse	Cathedral of the Immaculate Conception (Roman Catholic)		43°02′49″N 76°08′59″W
Syracuse	St. Paul's Cathedral (Episcopal)		43°02′54″N 76°09′01″W

== North Carolina ==
Municipality	Cathedral	Image	Location & References
Asheville	Cathedral of All Souls (Episcopal)		35°33′56″N 82°32′34″W
Belmont	Cathedral-Basilica of St. Mary Help of Christians (former cathedral) (Roman Catholic)		
Charlotte	Cathedral of Saint Patrick (Roman Catholic)		35°12′20″N 80°50′44″W
Charlotte	Holy Trinity Cathedral (Greek Orthodox)		35°12′26″N 80°51′10″W
Raleigh	Holy Name of Jesus Cathedral (Roman Catholic)		35°46′39″N 78°40′11″W
Raleigh	Sacred Heart Cathedral (former cathedral) (Roman Catholic)		
Raleigh	Pro-Cathedral of the Good Shepherd (former pro-cathedral) (Episcopal)		
Raleigh	St. George's Pro-Cathedral (Anglican Province of Christ the King)		35°48′12″N 78°40′34″W
Raleigh	St. Mary Cathedral (Coptic Orthodox)		
Wilmington	Saint Mary Pro-Cathedral (former pro-cathedral) (Roman Catholic)		

== North Dakota ==
Municipality	Cathedral	Image	Location & References
Bismarck	Cathedral of the Holy Spirit (Roman Catholic)		46°48′36″N 100°47′46″W
Fargo	Cathedral of St. Mary (Roman Catholic)		46°52′57″N 96°47′17″W
Fargo	Gethsemane Cathedral (Episcopal)		46°49′34″N 96°49′06″W

== Ohio ==
Municipality	Cathedral	Image	Location & References
Canton	St. George Cathedral (Romanian Catholic)		40°50′44″N 81°21′34″W
Cincinnati	Cathedral Basilica of Saint Peter in Chains (Roman Catholic)		39°06′14″N 84°31′09″W
Cincinnati	Christ Church Cathedral (Episcopal)		39°06′03″N 84°30′27″W
Cleveland	Cathedral of St. John the Evangelist (Roman Catholic)		41°30′10″N 81°41′18″W
Cleveland	Trinity Cathedral (Episcopal)		41°30′04″N 81°40′28″W
Cleveland	St. Theodosius Cathedral (Orthodox Church in America)		41°28′38″N 81°40′54″W
Cleveland	St. Mary's Cathedral (Romanian Orthodox Church)		41°27′53″N 81°48′00″W
Cleveland Heights (Cleveland area)	Saints Constantine and Helen Cathedral (Greek Orthodox)		41°31′08″N 81°33′34″W
Columbus	St. Joseph Cathedral (Roman Catholic)		39°57′46″N 82°59′40″W
Columbus	Annunciation Cathedral (Greek Orthodox)		39°58′24″N 83°00′10″W
Olmsted Falls (Cleveland area)	Annunciation Cathedral (Romanian Orthodox)		41°23′09″N 81°55′22″W
Parma (Cleveland area)	Cathedral of St. John the Baptist (Byzantine Catholic)		41°24′14″N 81°41′34″W
Parma (Cleveland area)	St. Josaphat Cathedral (Ukrainian Catholic)		41°24′25″N 81°42′45″W
Parma (Cleveland area)	St. Sava Cathedral (Serbian Orthodox)		41°23′33″N 81°41′18″W
Parma (Cleveland area)	St. Vladimir's Cathedral (Ukrainian Orthodox Church of the USA)		41°24′06″N 81°42′36″W
Parma (Cleveland area)	St. Sergius Cathedral (Russian Orthodox Church Outside Russia)		41°23′14″N 81°41′09″W
Reynoldsburg (Columbus area)	Cathedral of the Dormition of the Virgin Mary (Macedonian Orthodox) (not in communion with the Ecumenical Patriarch)		39°58′40″N 82°47′31″W
Rossford (Toledo area)	St. George Cathedral (Orthodox Church in America)		41°35′29″N 83°33′32″W
Steubenville	Holy Name Cathedral (Roman Catholic)		40°21′20″N 80°37′10″W
Strongsville	Mother of God Zyrovichy Orthodox Cathedral (Belarusian Orthodox)		41°19′52″N 81°48′05″W
Toledo	Our Lady, Queen of the Most Holy Rosary Cathedral (Roman Catholic)		41°40′21″N 83°33′22″W
Toledo	Holy Trinity Cathedral (Greek Orthodox)		41°39′23″N 83°31′45″W
Youngstown	St. Columba Cathedral (Roman Catholic)		41°06′12″N 80°39′04″W

== Oklahoma ==
Municipality	Cathedral	Image	Location & References
Oklahoma City	Cathedral of Our Lady of Perpetual Help (Roman Catholic)		35°30′10″N 97°31′52″W
Oklahoma City	St. Joseph Old Cathedral (Roman Catholic)		35°28′20″N 97°31′05″W
Oklahoma City	St. Paul's Cathedral (Episcopal)		35°28′31″N 97°30′57″W
Tulsa	Holy Family Cathedral (Roman Catholic)		36°08′52″N 95°59′24″W
Tulsa	All Saints Cathedral (Anglican Province of Christ the King)		36°01′52″N 95°55′54″W

== Oregon ==
Municipality	Cathedral	Image	Location & References
Baker City	St. Francis de Sales Cathedral (Roman Catholic)		44°46′45″N 117°49′52″W
Portland	St. Mary's Cathedral of the Immaculate Conception (Roman Catholic)		45°31′25″N 122°41′20″W
Portland	Trinity Cathedral (Episcopal)		45°31′29″N 122°41′27″W
Portland	Holy Trinity Cathedral (Greek Orthodox)		45°31′35″N 122°37′56″W
Portland	Holy Nativity of the Theotokos Cathedral (Holy Orthodox Church in North America) (not in communion with the Ecumenical Patriarch)		45°33′21″N 122°33′16″W

== Pennsylvania ==
Municipality	Cathedral	Image	Location & References
Allentown	Cathedral of Saint Catharine of Siena (Roman Catholic)		40°35′56″N 75°29′47″W
Allentown	Cathedral of the Protection of the Most Holy Theotokos (Ukrainian Orthodox)		40°37′14″N 75°27′45″W
Allison Park (Pittsburgh area)	St. Alexander Nevsky Cathedral (Orthodox Church in America)		40°33′39″N 79°59′55″W
Altoona	Cathedral of the Blessed Sacrament (Roman Catholic)		40°30′57″N 78°24′14″W
Bethlehem	Cathedral Church of the Nativity (Episcopal)		40°36′42″N 75°23′01″W
Bryn Athyn (Philadelphia area)	Bryn Athyn Cathedral (General Church of the New Jerusalem)		40°08′09″N 75°04′09″W
Camp Hill (Harrisburg area)	Holy Trinity Cathedral (Greek Orthodox)		40°15′59″N 76°55′03″W
Erie	St. Peter Cathedral (Roman Catholic)		42°07′27″N 80°05′13″W
Erie	Cathedral of St. Paul (Episcopal)		42°07′42″N 80°05′16″W
Greensburg	Blessed Sacrament Cathedral (Roman Catholic)		40°18′23″N 79°32′46″W
Harrisburg	Cathedral of Saint Patrick (Roman Catholic)		40°15′49″N 76°53′11″W
Harrisburg	St. Stephen's Cathedral (Episcopal)		40°15′39″N 76°53′09″W
Huntingdon Valley (Philadelphia area)	St. Mary's Cathedral (Malankara Orthodox Syrian) (Oriental Orthodox communion)		40°07′40″N 75°05′22″W
Johnstown	St. John Gualbert Cathedral (Roman Catholic)		40°19′31″N 78°54′55″W
Johnstown	Christ the Saviour Cathedral (Carpatho-Russian Orthodox)		40°20′59″N 78°56′47″W
Mayfield (Scranton area)	St. John the Baptist Cathedral (Russian Orthodox Church Outside Russia)		41°32′16″N 75°32′07″W
Munhall (Pittsburgh area)	St. John the Baptist Cathedral (Byzantine Catholic)		40°22′56″N 79°54′55″W
Philadelphia	Cathedral Basilica of Saints Peter and Paul (Roman Catholic)		39°57′26″N 75°10′08″W
Philadelphia	Philadelphia Episcopal Cathedral (Episcopal)		39°57′21″N 75°11′53″W
Philadelphia	St. George Cathedral (Greek Orthodox)		39°56′47″N 75°09′17″W
Philadelphia	St. Stephen Cathedral (Orthodox Church in America)		40°05′12″N 75°03′33″W
Philadelphia	Cathedral of the Immaculate Conception (Ukrainian Catholic)		39°57′59″N 75°09′01″W
Philadelphia	St. Vladimir Cathedral (Ukrainian Orthodox Church of the USA)		40°03′15″N 75°07′36″W
Philadelphia	St. Andrew's Cathedral (Russian Orthodox Patriarchate of Moscow)		39°57′49″N 75°08′47″W
Pittsburgh	St. Paul Cathedral (Roman Catholic)		40°26′51″N 79°56′59″W
Pittsburgh	Trinity Cathedral (Episcopal)		40°26′29″N 79°59′55″W
Pittsburgh	St. Nicholas Cathedral (Greek Orthodox)		40°26′41″N 79°57′00″W
Pittsburgh	St. George Cathedral (Antiochian Orthodox)		40°26′04″N 79°57′11″W
Pittsburgh	Holy Trinity Cathedral (Serbian Orthodox)		40°20′51″N 79°58′32″W
Quakertown (Philadelphia area)	Pro-Cathedral Church of the Incarnation (Holy Catholic Church – Anglican Rite) (not in communion with Rome)		40°26′27″N 75°20′42″W
Scranton	St. Peter's Cathedral (Roman Catholic)		41°24′38″N 75°39′50″W
Scranton	St. Stanislaus Cathedral (Polish National Catholic Church) (not in full communion with Rome)		41°23′38″N 75°40′11″W
Wilkes-Barre	Holy Resurrection Cathedral (Orthodox Church in America)		41°15′22″N 75°51′52″W
Wilkes-Barre	St. Stephen's Pro-Cathedral (Episcopal)		41°14′47″N 75°53′04″W

== Rhode Island ==
Municipality	Cathedral	Image	Location & References
Providence	Cathedral of SS. Peter and Paul (Roman Catholic)		41°49′9″N 71°25′1″W
Providence	Cathedral of St. John (Episcopal)		41°49′51.9888″N 71°24′35.4816″W

== South Carolina ==
Municipality	Cathedral	Image	Location & References
Charleston	Cathedral of St. John the Baptist (Roman Catholic)		32°46′35″N 79°56′04″W
Charleston	Grace Church Cathedral (Episcopal)		32°46′54″N 79°56′12″W
Charleston	Cathedral Church of St. Luke and St. Paul (Anglican Church in North America)		32°47′13″N 79°56′25″W
Columbia	Trinity Cathedral (Episcopal)		34°00′04″N 81°01′52″W
Columbia	Cathedral Church of the Epiphany (Anglican Catholic Church)		34°01′24″N 80°59′27″W
Columbia	Cathedral Church of the Apostles (Anglican)		34°00′28″N 81°01′50″W
Greenville	St. George Cathedral (Greek Orthodox)		34°51′22″N 82°23′57″W

== South Dakota ==
Municipality	Cathedral	Image	Location & References
Rapid City	Cathedral of Our Lady of Perpetual Help (Roman Catholic)		44°03′35″N 103°13′38″W
Sioux Falls	St. Joseph Cathedral (Roman Catholic)		43°33′10″N 96°44′04″W
Sioux Falls	Calvary Cathedral (Episcopal)		43°32′31″N 96°43′40″W

== Tennessee ==
Municipality	Cathedral	Image	Location & References
Knoxville	Cathedral of the Most Sacred Heart of Jesus (Roman Catholic)		35°55′33″N 84°00′03″W
Knoxville	St. John's Cathedral (Episcopal)		35°57′44″N 83°55′07″W
Memphis	Cathedral of the Immaculate Conception (Roman Catholic)		35°07′34″N 90°00′19″W
Memphis	St. Mary's Cathedral (Episcopal)		35°08′48″N 90°02′11″W
Monteagle	Christ Church Cathedral (Episcopal Missionary Church)		35°13′46″N 85°51′41″W
Nashville	Cathedral of the Incarnation (Roman Catholic)		36°09′04″N 86°47′59″W
Nashville	Christ Church Cathedral (Episcopal)		36°09′32″N 86°46′59″W

== Texas ==
Municipality	Cathedral	Image	Location & References
Amarillo	St. Mary's Cathedral (Roman Catholic)		35°12′11″N 101°50′56″W
Austin	St. Mary's Cathedral (Roman Catholic)		30°16′16″N 97°44′23″W
Beaumont	Saint Anthony Cathedral Basilica (Roman Catholic)		30°04′40″N 94°06′03″W
Bedford (Fort Worth area)	St. Vincent's Cathedral (Anglican Church in North America)		32°49′53″N 97°08′27″W
Brownsville	Immaculate Conception Cathedral (Roman Catholic)		25°54′09″N 97°29′46″W
Corpus Christi	Corpus Christi Cathedral (Roman Catholic)		27°47′40″N 97°23′47″W
Dallas	Cathedral Church of the Holy Communion (Anglican/Reformed Episcopal)		32°59′23″N 96°49′21″W
Dallas	Cathedral of Our Lady of Guadalupe (Roman Catholic)		32°47′19″N 96°47′51″W
Dallas	Cathedral Church of Saint Matthew (Episcopal)		32°48′30″N 96°46′21″W
Dallas	St. Seraphim of Sarov Cathedral (Orthodox Church in America)		32°49′10″N 96°48′14″W
El Paso	St. Patrick Cathedral (Roman Catholic)		31°45′56″N 106°29′35″W
El Paso	St. Francis Cathedral (Anglican)		31°49′01″N 106°31′47″W
Fort Worth	Saint Patrick Cathedral (Roman Catholic)		32°44′57″N 97°19′47″W
Galveston	St. Mary's Cathedral Basilica (Roman Catholic)		29°18′15″N 94°47′24″W
Houston	Sacred Heart Co-Cathedral (Roman Catholic)		29°44′58″N 95°22′07″W
Houston	Christ Church Cathedral (Episcopal)		29°45′34″N 95°21′41″W
Houston	Annunciation Cathedral (Greek Orthodox)		29°44′27″N 95°23′33″W
Houston	Cathedral of Our Lady of Walsingham (Personal Ordinariate of the Chair of Saint Peter-Catholic Church)		29°47′45″N 95°29′00″W
Laredo	Cathedral of San Agustin (Roman Catholic)		27°30′09″N 99°30′20″W
Lubbock	Christ the King Cathedral (Roman Catholic)		33°32′35″N 101°53′56″W
Plano	Christ Church Cathedral (Anglican Church in North America)		33°04′13″N 96°47′02″W
San Angelo	Sacred Heart Cathedral (Roman Catholic)		31°27′49″N 100°26′07″W
San Antonio	Cathedral of San Fernando (Roman Catholic)		29°25′28″N 98°29′39″W
San Antonio	Procathedral of St. Chad of Lichfield (Anglican Province of America)		
Spring (Houston area)	St. Timothy's Anglican Church (Anglican Church in North America)		30°01′24″N 95°31′05″W
Stafford (Houston area)	St. Thomas Indian Orthodox Cathedral (Malankara Orthodox) (Oriental Orthodox communion)		29°36′23″N 95°32′45″W
Tyler	Cathedral of the Immaculate Conception (Roman Catholic)		32°20′47″N 95°18′03″W
Victoria	Our Lady of Victory Cathedral (Roman Catholic)		28°49′27″N 96°59′32″W

== Utah ==
Municipality	Cathedral	Image	Location & References
Salt Lake City	Cathedral of the Madeleine (Roman Catholic)		40°46′11″N 111°52′54″W
Salt Lake City	St. Mark's Cathedral (Episcopal)		40°46′04″N 111°53′04″W
Salt Lake City	Holy Trinity Cathedral (Greek Orthodox)		40°45′47″N 111°53′57″W

== Vermont ==
Municipality	Cathedral	Image	Location & References
Burlington	Cathedral of St. Joseph (Roman Catholic)		44°29′01″N 73°12′53″W
Burlington	Cathedral Church of St. Paul (Episcopal)		44°28′47″N 73°13′06″W

== Virginia ==
Municipality	Cathedral	Image	Location & References
Arlington	Cathedral of St. Thomas More (Roman Catholic)		38°52′15″N 77°06′12″W
Norfolk	Annunciation Cathedral (Greek Orthodox)		36°54′29″N 76°16′27″W
Orkney Springs	Cathedral Shrine of the Transfiguration (Episcopal)		38°47′41″N 78°49′16″W
Richmond	Cathedral of the Sacred Heart (Roman Catholic)		37°32′51″N 77°27′08″W
Richmond	Sts. Constantine & Helen Cathedral (Greek Orthodox)		37°33′41″N 77°29′37″W

== Washington ==
Municipality	Cathedral	Image	Location & References
Bremerton	St. Charles Anglican Cathedral (Anglican Church in North America)		47°37′57″N 122°39′06″W
Seattle	St. James Cathedral (Roman Catholic)		47°36′27″N 122°19′33″W
Seattle	St. Mark's Cathedral (Episcopal)		47°37′55″N 122°19′18″W
Seattle	St. Spiridon Cathedral (Orthodox Church in America)		47°37′20″N 122°19′49″W
Seattle	St. Nicholas Cathedral (Russian Orthodox Church Outside Russia)		47°37′01″N 122°18′55″W
Seattle	Saint Nectarios American Orthodox Cathedral (Holy Orthodox Church in North America) (not in communion with the Ecumenical Patriarch)		47°42′13″N 122°20′19″W
Spokane	Cathedral of Our Lady of Lourdes (Roman Catholic)		47°39′30″N 117°25′42″W
Spokane	Cathedral of St. John (Episcopal)		47°38′41″N 117°24′34″W
Yakima	St. Paul's Cathedral (Roman Catholic)		46°35′46″N 120°31′31″W

== West Virginia ==
Municipality	Cathedral	Image	Location & References
Charles Town	Cathedral Church of the Ascension (Anglican Church in North America)		39°16′13″N 77°50′25″W
Charleston	Basilica of the Co-Cathedral of the Sacred Heart (Roman Catholic)		38°20′50″N 81°37′58″W
Charleston	St. George Orthodox Cathedral (Antiochian Orthodox)		38°21′10″N 81°38′08″W
Wheeling	St. Joseph Cathedral (Roman Catholic)		40°04′00″N 80°43′11″W

== Wisconsin ==
Municipality	Cathedral	Image	Location & References
Eau Claire	Christ Church Cathedral (Episcopal)		44°48′33″N 91°29′48″W
Fond du Lac	St. Paul's Cathedral (Episcopal)		43°46′45″N 88°26′56″W
Green Bay	St. Francis Xavier Cathedral (Roman Catholic)		44°30′41″N 88°00′41″W
La Crosse	Cathedral of Saint Joseph the Workman (Roman Catholic)		43°48′41″N 91°14′55″W
Madison	St. Bernard Church (Roman Catholic) (Pope Francis named St. Bernard's the diocesan cathedral in 2023. It will be consecrated as a cathedral in 2025.)		43°05′40″N 89°20′42″W
Milwaukee	Cathedral of St. John the Evangelist (Roman Catholic)		43°02′31″N 87°54′14″W
Milwaukee	All Saints' Cathedral (Episcopal)		43°02′45″N 87°54′05″W
Milwaukee	St. Sava Cathedral (Serbian Orthodox)		42°59′12″N 87°58′44″W
Superior	Cathedral of Christ the King (Roman Catholic)		46°43′15″N 92°05′39″W

== Wyoming ==
Municipality	Cathedral	Image	Location & References
Cheyenne	St. Mary's Cathedral (Roman Catholic)		41°08′15″N 104°49′05″W
Laramie	St. Matthew's Cathedral (Episcopal)		41°18′45″N 105°35′34″W

== United States territories ==
=== American Samoa ===
Municipality	Cathedral	Image	Location & References
Fagatogo	Co-Cathedral of St. Joseph the Worker (Roman Catholic)		14°16′46″S 170°41′24″W
Tafuna	Cathedral of the Holy Family (Roman Catholic)		14°19′52″S 170°44′02″W

=== Guam ===
Municipality	Cathedral	Image	Location & References
Agaña (Hagåtña)	Dulce Nombre de Maria Cathedral-Basilica (Roman Catholic)		13°28′27″N 144°45′09″E

=== Northern Mariana Islands ===
Municipality	Cathedral	Image	Location & References
Chalan Kanoa (Saipan)	Our Lady of Mount Carmel Cathedral (Roman Catholic)		15°09′04″N 145°42′07″E

=== Puerto Rico ===
Municipality	Cathedral	Image	Location & References
Arecibo	Catedral de San Felipe Apóstol (Roman Catholic)		18°28′23″N 66°42′55″W
Caguas	Catedral Dulce Nombre de Jesús (Roman Catholic)		18°14′03″N 66°02′03″W
Fajardo	Catedral Santiago Apóstol (Roman Catholic)		18°19′37″N 65°39′12″W
Humacao	Concatedral Dulce Nombre de Jesús (Roman Catholic)		18°09′01″N 65°49′34″W
Mayagüez	Catedral Nuestra Señora de la Candelaria (Roman Catholic)		18°12′04″N 67°08′18″W
Ponce	Catedral de Nuestra Señora de la Guadalupe (Roman Catholic)		18°00′43″N 66°36′50″W
San Juan	Catedral Metropolitana Basílica de San Juan Bautista (Roman Catholic)		18°27′57″N 66°07′04″W
San Juan	Catedral San Juan Bautista (Episcopal)		18°26′55″N 66°04′16″W

=== U.S. Virgin Islands ===
Municipality	Cathedral	Image	Location & References
Charlotte Amalie (St. Thomas)	SS. Peter and Paul Cathedral (Roman Catholic)		18°20′28″N 64°56′12″W
Charlotte Amalie (St. Thomas)	Cathedral Church of All Saints (Episcopal)		18°20′42″N 64°55′53″W

== 'Cathedrals' without an episcopal function ==
- West Angeles Cathedral (Pentecostal) in Los Angeles, California
- Cathedral of Promise (Metropolitan Community Church) Sacramento, California
- The First Cathedral, "A Church for all people" in Bloomfield, Connecticut (Black Baptist)
- Sunshine Cathedral, in Fort Lauderdale (Metropolitan Community Church)
- Cathedral of the Rockies, in Boise (United Methodist)
- Greater Allen A. M. E. Cathedral of New York(Jamaica, Queens) (African Methodist Episcopal)
- Cathedral of the Air in Lakehurst
- Cathedral of Hope (United Church of Christ)
- Cathedral of Hope, in Pittsburgh (Presbyterian)
- Cathedral of the Pines in Rindge, New Hampshire
- Christ Cathedral (Fayetteville, North Carolina) (Evangelical)
- Mount Olive Cathedral, in Memphis, Tennessee (Christian Methodist Episcopal)
- SunCoast Cathedral, Venice, Florida
- The Cathedral at Greater Faith (Pentecostal), in Bronx, New York
- St. Paul's Episcopal Church in Richmond, Virginia was often referred to as the "Cathedral of the Confederacy"

== See also ==
- List of cathedrals
- List of the Catholic cathedrals of the United States
- Dioceses of the Episcopal Church in the United States of America
- List of Coptic Orthodox Churches in the United States
- List of largest church buildings in the world
- List of basilicas
