= Annunciation Melkite Catholic Cathedral =

Our Lady of the Annunciation Melkite Greek Catholic Cathedral
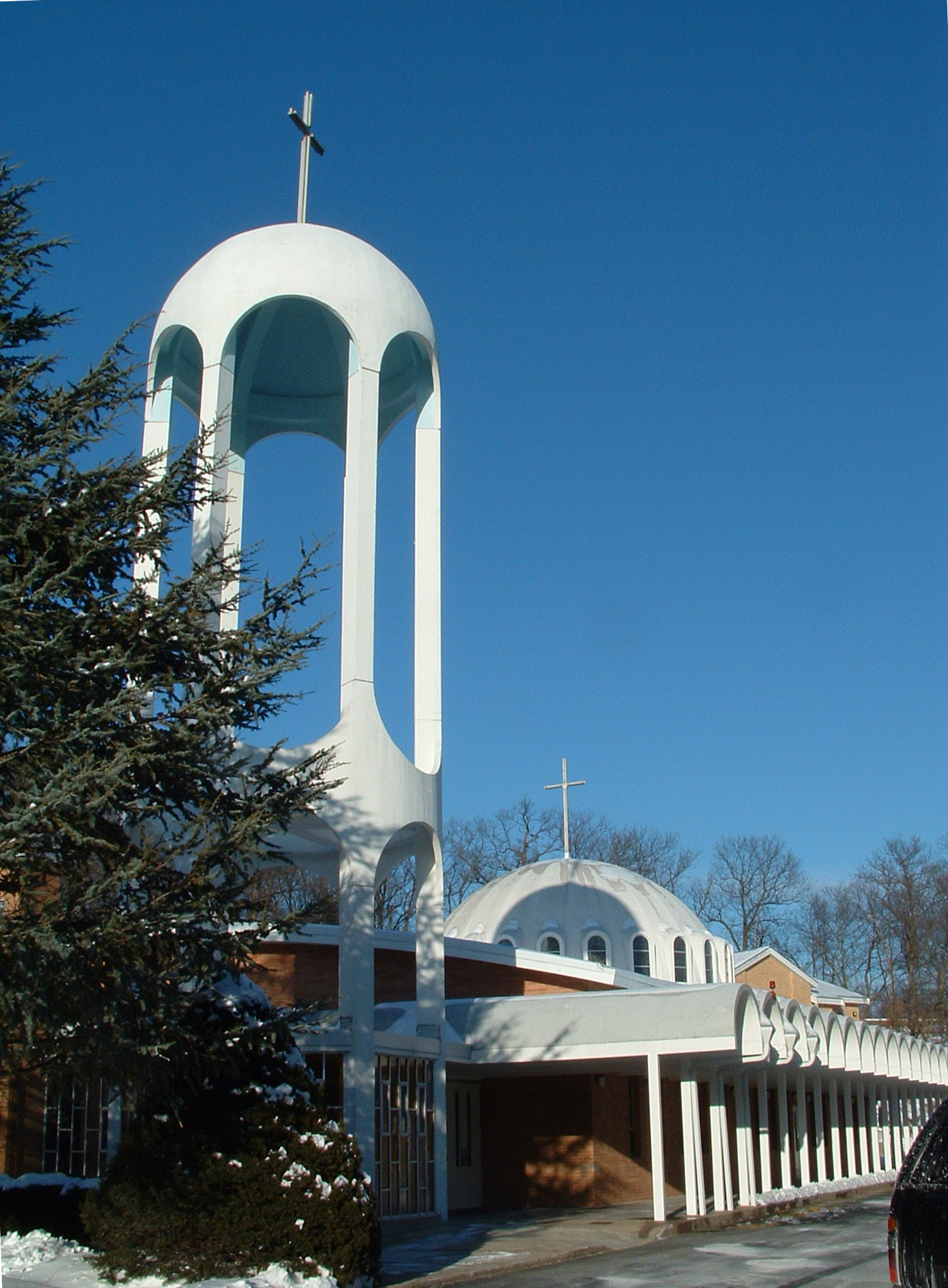

- Location within Massachusetts Location within the United States
- 42°17′51.03″N 71°8′3.7″W
- Location: West Roxbury, Massachusetts
- Country: United States
- Denomination: Melkite Greek Catholic Church
- Website: www.bostonmelkite.org

History
- Status: Cathedral/Parish
- Founded: 1908 (parish)
- Dedication: Annunciation
- Dedicated: April 24, 1966

Architecture
- Functional status: Active
- Architect: Lawrence J. Cuneo
- Years built: 1964-1966

Administration
- Diocese: Eparchy of Newton

Clergy
- Bishop: Most Rev. Francois Beyrouti
- Rector: Rt. Rev. Philip Raczka

Our Lady of the Annunciation Melkite Greek Catholic Cathedral in the West Roxbury neighborhood of Boston, Massachusetts, is a modern cathedral inspired by Byzantine architecture. It is the principal church of the Melkite Greek Catholic Eparchy of Newton, which encompasses the entire United States, the seat of its hierarch, currently Bishop Francois Beyrouti, and the parish church of the Melkite Greek Catholic community in Greater Boston. Its present structure and its status as a cathedral date to 1966; previous to that, Our Lady of the Annunciation Melkite Catholic Church was a parish church in the South End of Boston.

== Melkite immigration to Boston ==
In the 1890s, Christians from Syria and the Levant (now Lebanon) emigrated to the United States in search of better economic opportunities and to escape Ottoman rule in their homelands. Among the immigrants were Melkite Greek Catholics. Boston was among the northeastern cities in which the Melkites settled, attracted to it by opportunities in the city's garment district.

The majority of the Melkite immigrants to Boston, and elsewhere in eastern Massachusetts, hailed from in and around Zahlé in the Levant. As was typical in that era, they were soon joined by a priest dispatched from the region in which they originated. Thus, Father Joseph Simon, a hieromonk of the Basilian Salvatorian Order (BSO), which had responsibility for many of the parishes in Zahle, arrived in 1896. However, he remained only briefly in Boston, moving on to settle in Lawrence, Massachusetts, where the Melkites were more populous than in Boston.

Although both he and his Basilian successors, Father Philip Batal and Archimandrite Basil Nahas, periodically ministered to those in Boston, the community was anxious to have its own church and a permanently assigned priest. Since there was no Melkite hierarch in the United States at the time, they petitioned John Williams, Catholic Archbishop of Boston, who had canonical jurisdiction of them, to address their pastoral needs. The Archbishop, however, was unconvinced that their numbers were sufficient to support a priest or church and declined to act on the request.

== Parish church ==
A decade after Father Simon's arrival, the Melkite Catholic Archbishop of Zahle Cyril Moghabghab (later Melkite Patriarch) conducted a pastoral visit to the emigrant communities of North and South America, including that at Boston. Meeting with Coadjutor Archbishop William O'Connell, he obtained agreement that the Melkite congregation would be afforded a church as soon as O'Connell succeeded to the episcopal throne of Boston. Two years later, in 1908, Archbishop O'Connell approved the purchase of a commercial structure at 178 Harrison Avenue in the South End of Boston, the neighborhood in which the majority of Melkites resided.

The building required remodeling to be suitable for worship. A photograph taken subsequent to the renovations shows a rudimentary iconostasis, absent doors, suggesting that its interior had only superficial resemblance to the traditional styling of Byzantine churches. This was common in a time when such church furnishings were typically omitted from Eastern Catholic churches, as they were foreign to the predominant Latin Catholics, the majority of whom were unaware of their religious significance to their Eastern counterparts.

The church was titled as Our Lady of the Annunciation Syrian Catholic Church and the Divine Liturgy was first served there in November 1908, although the building and its altar were not formally dedicated until June 27, 1910. Archimandrite Nicholas Ghannam, BSO, Superior of the Salvatorian monastic community in Zahlé prior to arriving in Boston, was named as its first pastor. He served in that role, assisted by his brother, Father Athanasius Ghannam, BSO, for the next seventeen years. He was succeeded in 1925 by Father Peter Abouzeid, BSO.

During the latter's eight-year tenure the mortgage was retired and both church and rectory were remodeled; however, it became increasingly apparent that a larger church was required. The existing building was inadequate to house a congregation that had grown in numbers, as Melkites relocated to the city, perceiving that employment opportunities were more plentiful in the urban setting than elsewhere. Despite this perceived need, the economic crisis in the aftermath of the 1929 Stock Market Crash precluded taking any action on the matter.

== Relocation to Warren Avenue ==
In 1933, Father Abouzeid was transferred to Lawrence, Massachusetts, and replaced by Archimandrite Flavian Zahar, BSO. The new pastor was likewise frustrated in his desire to build a replacement church, initially by the financial constraints of a post-Depression economy and, subsequently, by entry of the United States into World War II. A vacant Protestant church on nearby Warren Avenue, at the corner of West Canton Street, offered a viable solution to wartime restrictions on non-essential civilian construction and the parish purchased it.

The new church was renovated and dedicated on May 3, 1942. Photographs of its interior show a high altar at the rear of the sanctuary, statuary, and an altar railing; there is no iconostasis. The highly Latinized appearance offers no suggestion that the parish was anything other than a typical Catholic church. The failure to employ traditional forms of Byzantine church architecture, decor, and furnishings was reflective of prevailing attitudes that Eastern Catholics in the diaspora should largely conform to the styles and customs of their Latin Catholic counterparts.

Parishioners were generous in meeting the parish's financial needs and celebrated by burning the mortgage on the new church only three years after its purchase. However, a few months later, they mourned the death of Archimandrite Zahar, who had led them in achieving the goal of a new church. Father Beshara Thalage, BSO, administered the parish until Protosyncellos Eftimios Saba, BSO, was named as its fourth pastor in the early months of 1946.

Like his predecessors, Father Saba had a distinguished background, having been both a seminary rector and First Secretary to Patriarch Cyril IX Moghabghab. Father served the parish for ten years. Particularly during the last half of that decade, many Melkites moved from the South End, although they continued to travel back to their old neighborhood to attend Divine Liturgy and parish functions. When Father Saba died in 1956, Archimandrite John Jadaa and Father Elias Kweiter, both Salvatorians, had responsibility for administering the parish until mid-1957, when Archimandrite Nicholas Borkhoche, BSO, was appointed pastor.

Reflective of both the growing parish and the demands on the time of Father Borkhoche, who was simultaneously serving as Regional Superior of the Salvatorians, Father Georges Coriarty, BSO, was assigned as his assistant. For the second time in the parish's half-century of existence, the need for larger quarters was raised; this time, the issue was also discussed as to whether the time had come to seek a location more conveniently situated to the new neighborhoods in which parishioners had settled.

However, Father Borkhohe's responsibilities to his religious order necessitated that he relocate to St Basil's Monastery in Methuen, Massachusetts, only three years after being named pastor. Consequently, the questions of rebuilding and possibly relocating were not pursued beyond the most preliminary stages of discussion. Subsequent to his departure, Father Coriaty administered the parish for a brief period.

== Construction of the church in West Roxbury ==
In 1960, Father Coriaty was transferred to Canada and Archimandrite Jean Bassoul, (also known as JOHN Bassoul), BSO, was named as sixth pastor of the church. His term was also brief, lasting only two years, but he is credited with initiating the process of relocating the church. Following up on the earlier discussions that had been had, it was immediately apparent to him that the Melkite faithful were not only no longer concentrated in Boston's South End neighborhood, but that they had not been for some time.

As early as 1942, when they first occupied the building on Warren Avenue, a program book produced for a parish celebration already reflected significant dispersion of the parishioners among Boston's neighborhoods and suburbs, particularly those to the south. Almost twenty years later, travel demands, a shortage of parking, neighborhood deterioration, and the need for extensive and expensive repairs, necessitated that an alternative site be identified.

A census of registered parishioners confirmed that substantial numbers of them were living in Boston's West Roxbury neighborhood. A 4.2-acre (17,000 m^{2}) property on the VFW Parkway in West Roxbury was identified as promising, in its proximity to West Roxbury, easy road access, and suitability of the terrain for building. There were, however, complicating factors involved. The land was owned by the City of Boston and, assuming the city's willingness to sell a parcel designated as conservation land, its ability to enter into a sale was pre-conditioned on legislative approval under restrictive home-rule provisions applicable to the city under Massachusetts General Law.

Father Bassoul's negotiations with the city, aided and encouraged by Cardinal Richard Cushing, Archbishop of Boston, who had a history of affording support to the Eastern Catholic communities within his archdiocese, were successful. Legislative approval for the sale was secured and Governor John Volpe signed the bill authorizing the city to set a price and transact the sale. At this point, Father Bassoul's efforts were halted by an announcement that the Holy Synod of the Melkite Church had elected him to head the Archeparchy of Homs, Hama, and Yabroud in Syria. Before departing for his new position, he was ordained to the episcopate at Boston's Cathedral of the Holy Cross on April 28, 1962, at a Divine Liturgy presided by Cardinal Cushing, garbed in Byzantine hierarchal vesture.

Father John Elya, BSO (later Bishop), briefly administered the parish until appointment of Father Lucien Malouf, BSO, as its seventh pastor on November 1, 1962. Having twice previously constructed parish churches, Father Malouf was undaunted by the prospect of doing so a third time. Within weeks of taking office, he and his newly appointed assistant, Father Charles Aboody, undertook to ascertain the status of the proposed purchase. In discussions with the cardinal and chancery officials, it quickly became evident that, after the announcement of Father Bassoul's election as archbishop, critical momentum had been lost and the city of Boston had failed to act on the final crucial step, setting a purchase price.

With a construction boom then underway in the northeast region, the priests feared that rising costs, already in excess of what had been planned, would become prohibitive if action was not taken quickly to finalize the sale and commence building. With the cardinal's encouragement, they renewed negotiation with city officials. Finally, these efforts produced agreement at a price that the parish deemed affordable and Mayor John Collins signed the deed, transferring ownership of the land to the parish.

A building committee was formed and Lawrence J. Cuneo was retained as the principal architect for the design of the church. A groundbreaking ceremony, held on May 31, 1964, was followed by a banquet at which Cardinal Cushing announced a building fund drive. He then immediately pledged $300,000 of personal funds, an amount equal to one-half of the projected building costs, to launch that drive. Four and a half months later, on October 15, 1964, a contract was awarded to Rich Construction Company, to serve as general contractor for the project.

== From parish church to cathedral ==
In January 1966, the Holy See announced the appointment of Father Justin Najmy, pastor of St. Basil the Great Church in Central Falls, Rhode Island, as the first Exarch for Melkites in the United States. He chose the Church of the Annunciation as the cathedral for the new exarchate, and on March 25, 1966, the Feast of the Annunciation, the cathedral celebrated its inaugural Divine Liturgy. The altar was consecrated by Boston Auxiliary Bishop Thomas J. Riley on April 23, 1966, and the following day the building was solemnly dedicated. Bishop Najmy was enthroned in the new cathedral in June 1966 and delegated Fr. Lucien Malouf, BSO as its rector.

== Later events ==
In 1976, the Melkite Greek Catholic Church in the United States was elevated from the status of an exarchate to that of an eparchy. On May 8, 1977, at a Patriarchal Liturgy served at the cathedral, the Melkite Greek Catholic Eparchy of Newton was canonically erected with Archbishop Joseph Tawil as eparch.

== Gallery ==
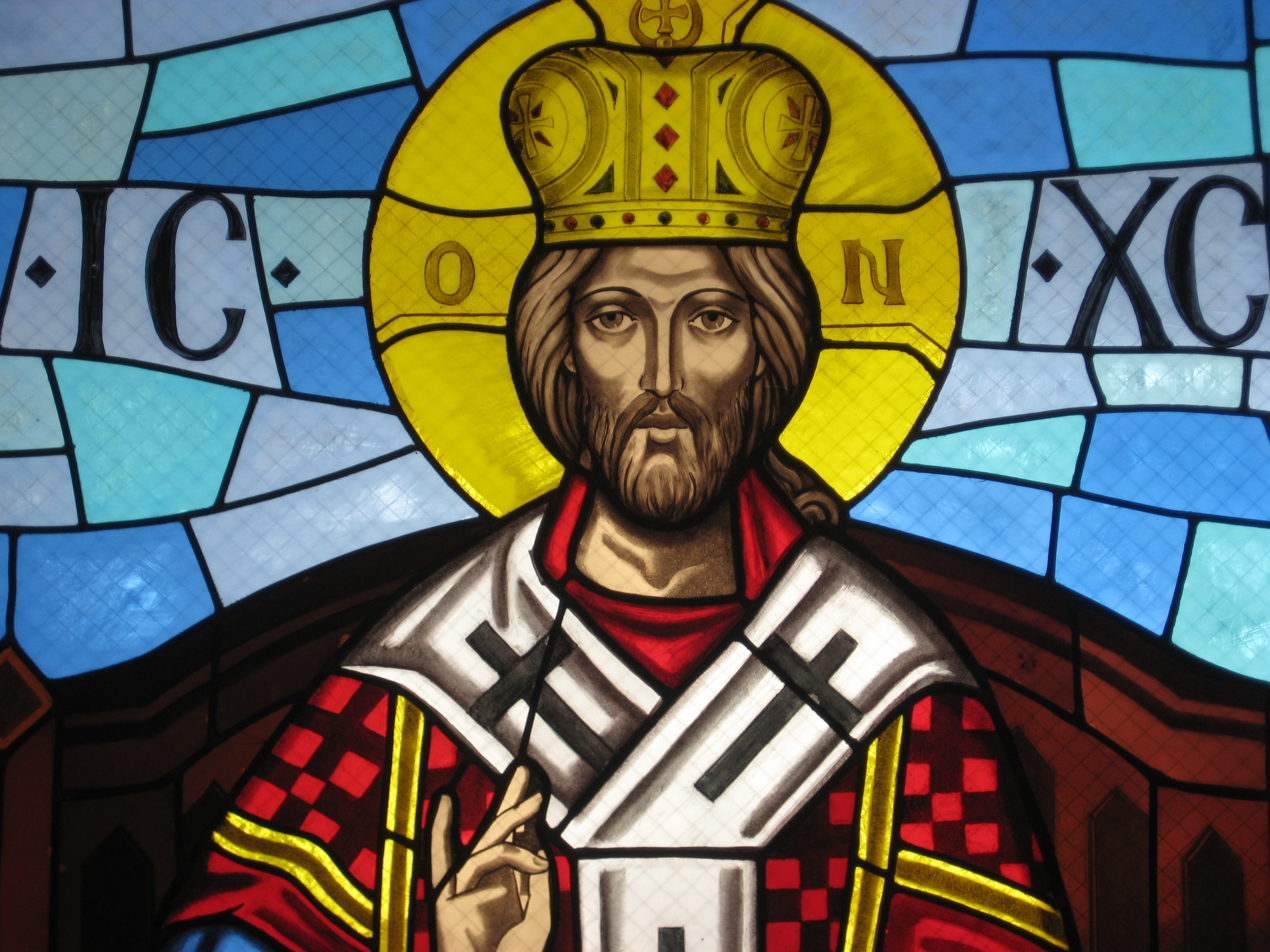
Detail of triptych window depicting Christ enthroned

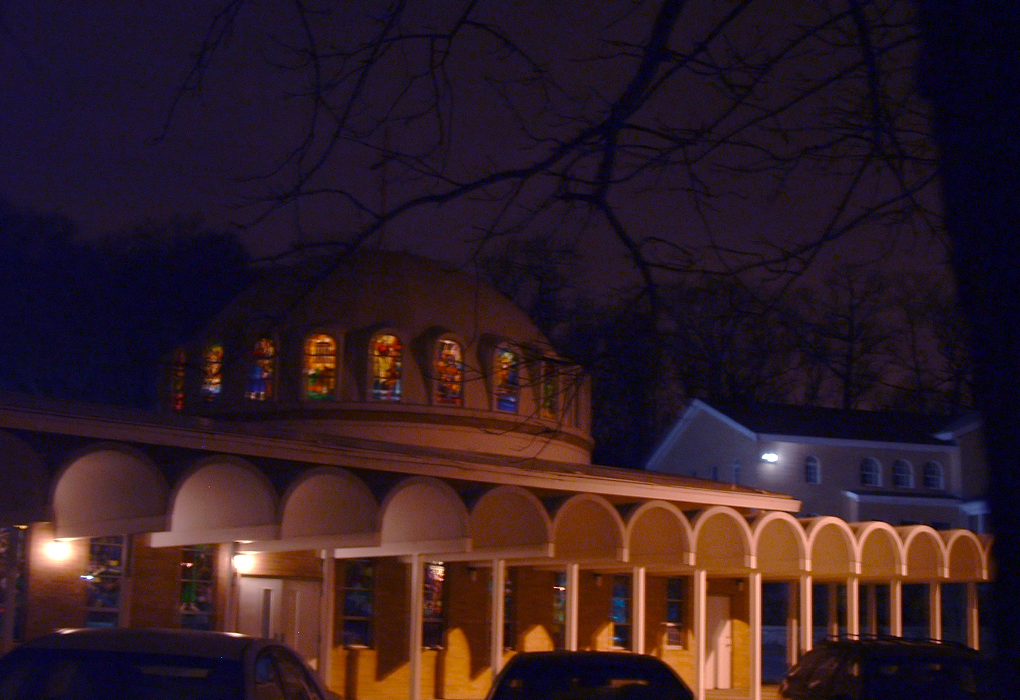
Annunciation Cathedral by night

== See also ==
- Melkite Greek Catholic Eparchy of Newton
- List of Catholic cathedrals in the United States
- List of cathedrals in the United States
