= Justin Najmy =

American Melkite bishop (1898–1968)

His Excellency, The Most Reverend Justin Najmy BA
- Exarch of Newton; Titular Bishop of Augustopolis
- Church: Melkite Greek Catholic
- See: Eparchy of Newton
- In office: Jan 27, 1966—June 11, 1968
- Successor: Archbishop Joseph Tawil
- Previous posts: Pastor of St. Basil the Great in Central Falls, Rhode Island

Orders
- Ordination: December 25, 1926
- Consecration: May 29, 1966 by Archbishop Athanasios Toutoungi

Personal details
- Born: April 23, 1898 Aleppo, Syria
- Died: June 11, 1968 (aged 70) Newton, Massachusetts, United States

Justin Najmy, BA (April 23, 1898 – June 11, 1968) was a Syrian prelate who served as the first Eparch of Newton in the Melkite Greek Catholic Church from 1966 to 1968. He served for two years before his death at age 70. He was a member of the Basilian Aleppian Order.

== Biography ==
Justin Abraham Najmy was born on April 23, 1898. He joined the Basilian Aleppian Order, studied at the seminary at Deir-ech-Chir and at the Propaganda Fidei, and was ordained a priest in Rome on December 25, 1926.

Moving to the United States, he served as pastor of St. Basil the Great Church in Central Falls, Rhode Island, before his appointment as apostolic exarch by Pope Paul VI on January 27, 1966. The appointment of Najmy as exarch at first drew protest from the Melkite patriarch Maximos IV, because he and the Synod of the Melkite Church had chosen a different candidate, and the appointment, decided by the Sacred Congregation for the Eastern Churches, made the new Exarch subject to the Holy See, and only responsible to the Patriarch and the Synod in liturgical matters.

On May 29, 1966, in a ceremony at the Cathedral of the Holy Cross in Boston, Najmy was consecrated a bishop by Athanasios Toutoungi, archbishop of Aleppo, his former seminary colleague, and received the title of titular bishop of Augustopolis-in-Phrygia. The following month he was formally enthroned as exarch. He established his episcopal see at the Church of the Annunciation in suburban Boston, which became the cathedral for the newly created Apostolic Exarchate of United States of America, Faithful of the Oriental Rite (Melkite).

In the wake of the Six-Day War in June 1967, Najmy welcomed the bishops of Middle Eastern churches in the United States for a meeting in Boston. Bishops of the Antiochian Orthodox Church, the Maronite Catholic Church, and from Armenian and Syrian churches attended.

Bishop Najmy did not serve as exarch for long. He died of a heart attack on June 11, 1968, and was succeeded by Joseph Tawil. He is buried at the parish cemetery of St. Basil the Great in Cumberland, Rhode Island.

== See also ==
- Melkite Greek Catholic Eparchy of Newton
- Melkite Greek Catholic Church
- Maximos IV Sayegh
