= St. Jude Melkite Catholic Church =

Melkite Greek Catholic Church in Miami, Florida, USA

Saint Jude Melkite Greek Catholic Church
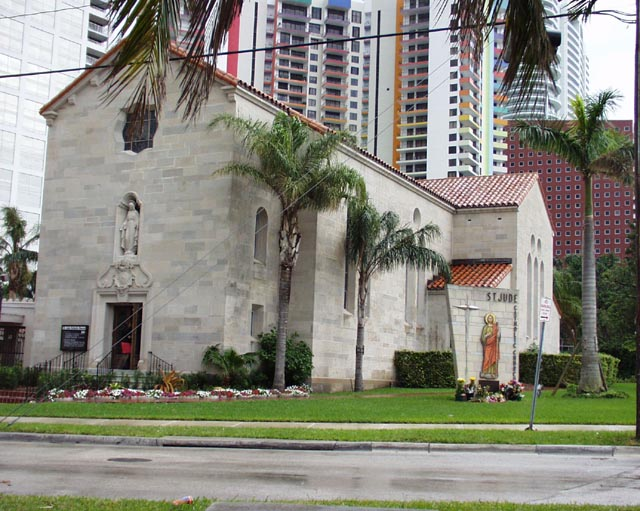
- Saint Jude Melkite Greek Catholic Church

Religion
- Affiliation: Melkite Greek Catholic Church
- Region: Catholicism
- Rite: Byzantine
- Ecclesiastical or organisational status: Church
- Leadership: Rev. Ezzat Bathouche, Pastor
- Year consecrated: 1946

Location
- Location: Miami, Florida
- State: Florida
- Interactive map of Saint Jude Melkite Greek Catholic Church
- Coordinates: 25.75753°N 80.19286°W

Architecture
- Architects: Henry Dagit & Sons of Philadelphia
- Type: Chapel
- Style: Romanesque Gothic
- General contractor: McCloskey & Co. of Philadelphia
- Groundbreaking: May 3, 1946
- Completed: September 1946
- Materials: Reinforced concrete, Indiana Bedford Limestone

Website
- https://stjudemiami.org

St. Jude Melkite Catholic Church is a Melkite Greek Catholic Church which follows the Byzantine Rite. It is one of 45 Melkite Greek Catholic churches or missions reporting to the Melkite Greek Catholic Eparchy of Newton. The Church is located at 126 SE Fifteenth Road in Brickell, a neighborhood in Miami, Florida.

== Architecture ==
The church was built in 1946 in Romanesque Gothic style and designed by the architectural firm of Henry D. Dagit & Sons of Philadelphia and constructed by the firm of McCloskey & Co., also of Philadelphia. It is built of reinforced concrete and faced with Indiana Bedford limestone with an exposed concrete ceiling and stenciled color decorations on the exposed beams and arches. The floors are of terrazzo and the main altar and two side altars have marble facing. The cornerstone was laid on May 3, 1946, and the church was completed by September 1946. The interior design of the church was modified to conform to the Byzantine Rite. An iconostasis was added as well as Byzantine Icons.
