= St. Anne Melkite Catholic Cathedral (North Hollywood, California) =

St. Anne Melkite Greek Catholic Cathedral
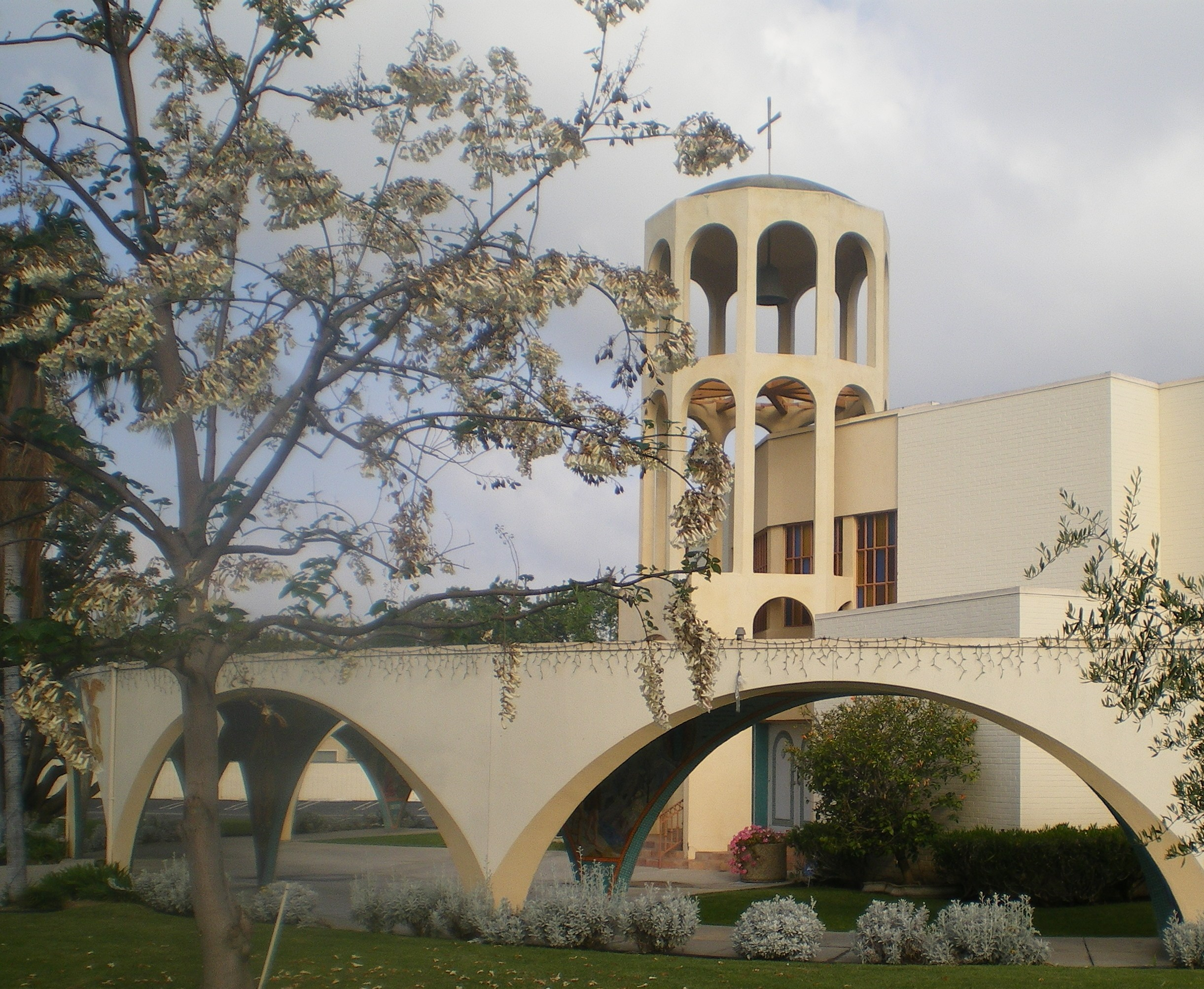

- Location within California
- 34°09′02.4″N 118°22′32.4″W
- Location: North Hollywood, California
- Address: 11211 Moorpark St, North Hollywood, CA 91602
- Country: United States
- Denomination: Melkite Greek Catholic Church
- Website: www.melkitesinlosangeles.org

History
- Status: Cathedral/Parish
- Founded: 1909 (parish)
- Dedicated: July 25, 1965

Architecture
- Functional status: Active
- Years built: 1964-1965

Administration
- Diocese: Eparchy of Newton

Clergy
- Bishop: Bishop-Elect Francois Beyrouti
- Rector: Rev. Dimitri Saliba, BCO

St. Anne Melkite Greek Catholic Cathedral in the North Hollywood neighborhood of Los Angeles, is a modern cathedral inspired by Byzantine architecture. It is the co-cathedral church of the Melkite Greek Catholic Eparchy of Newton, which encompasses the entire United States.

== Parish church ==
Saint Anne Cathedral was founded in 1909 when Father Gerasimos Sawaya, the first Melkite missionary priest, traversed the west coast visiting and ministering to the Melkites in the Western United States. St. Anne Cathedral was the Mother Church of the following Melkite communities founded from it: Holy Cross Church in Placentia, CA; Virgin Mary Mission in Temecula, CA; St. Jacob Mission in San Diego, CA; St. Philip Mission in San Bernardino, CA; St. Paul Mission in West Los Angeles, CA; and Annunciation Mission in Covina, CA. In addition, St. Anne Church was also involved with the foundation of the following communities: St. George Church in Sacramento, CA; St. Elias the Prophet Church in San Jose, CA; and St. John of the Desert Church in Phoenix, AZ; and St. Joseph Mission in Seattle, WA.

== From parish church to cathedral ==
On May 20, 2015, Pope Francis named Saint Anne Melkite Greek Catholic Church in Los Angeles, California, as Co-Cathedral of the Melkite Greek Catholic Eparchy of Newton.

== Later events ==
In 1976, the Melkite Greek Catholic Church in the United States was elevated from the status of an Exarchate to that of an Eparchy. On May 8, 1977, at a Patriarchal Liturgy served at the cathedral, the Melkite Greek Catholic Eparchy of Newton was canonically erected with Archbishop Joseph Tawil as Eparch.

== See also ==
- Melkite Greek Catholic Eparchy of Newton
- List of Catholic cathedrals in the United States
- List of cathedrals in the United States
