= Saint John the Baptist Cathedral (Fresno, California) =

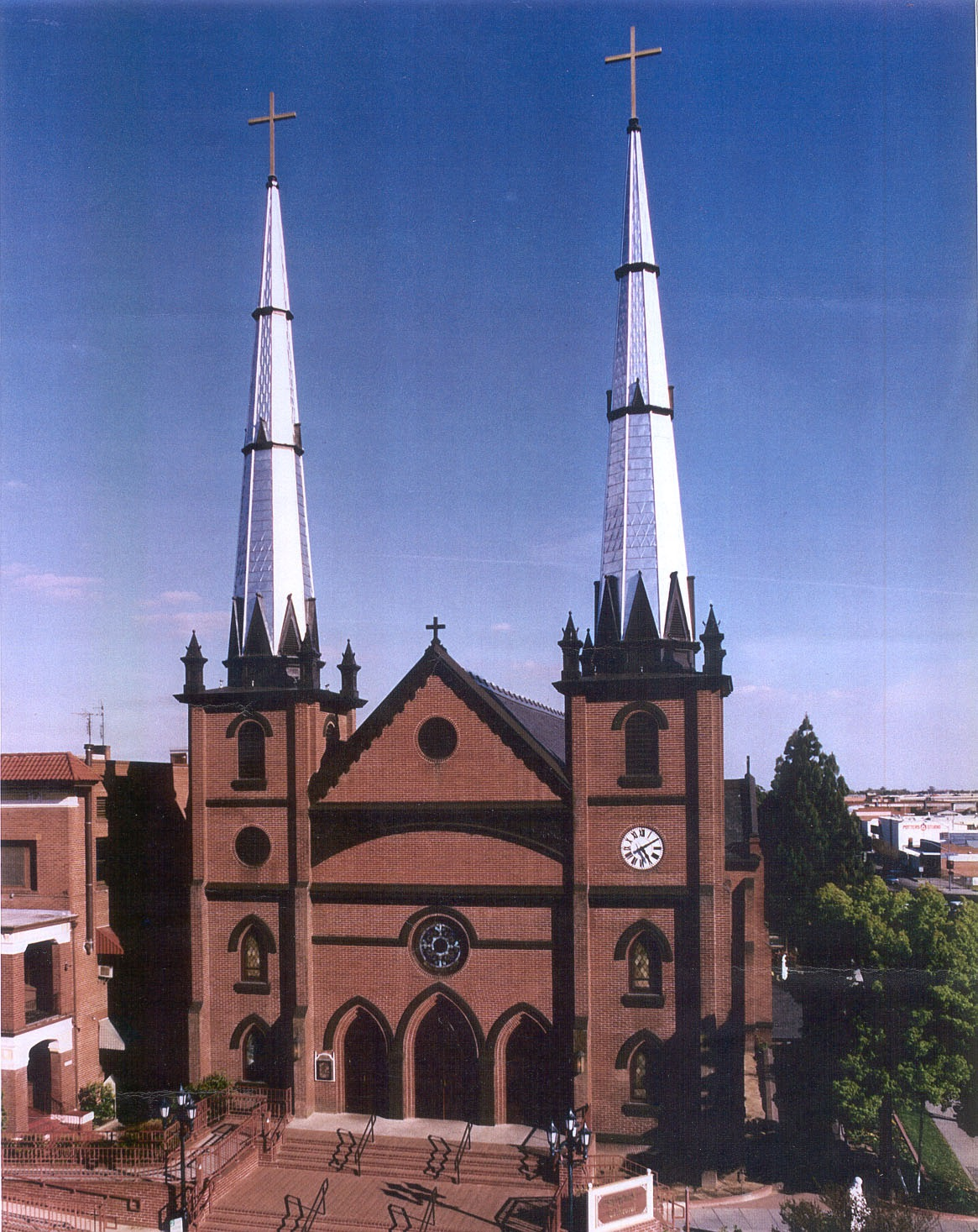

- Location in California
- 36°44′26″N 119°46′57″W
- Location: 2814 Mariposa St. Fresno, California
- Country: United States
- Denomination: Roman Catholic
- Website: www.stjohnsfresno.org

History
- Founded: 1882
- Dedication: June 7, 1903

Architecture
- Architect: Thomas Bermingham
- Architectural type: Gothic Revival
- Groundbreaking: 1902
- Completed: 1903

Specifications
- Materials: Brick

Administration
- Diocese: Fresno

Clergy
- Bishop: Most Rev. Joseph Vincent Brennan
- Rector: Rev. Alex Chavez

Saint John the Baptist Cathedral is the mother church of the Roman Catholic Diocese of Fresno on Mariposa Street in Fresno, California. Erected in 1882, St. John Parish is the oldest parish in Fresno.

The current Saint John the Baptist Church was dedicated in 1903 and was designated a cathedral in 1922. As of 2025, the rector of the cathedral is The Very Reverend Fr. Salvador Gonzalez Jr.

== History ==
After the founding of Fresno in 1872, the few Catholics in the new town travelled to Visalia, California, to attend mass. By 1878, they had started fundraising for a church in Fresno. The property for the new church on M Street was donated by the Central Pacific Railroad donated two lots and their Bishop Francisco Mora y Borrell of the Diocese of Monterey-Los Angeles.

The construction of St. John the Baptist was completed in 1880. It was a brick structure with a 90 ft (27 m) steeple. Mora dedicated the new church in 1882. Several Sisters of the Holy Cross arrived in Fresno in 1893; one year later, they opened Saint Augustine's Academy.

By the beginning of the 20th century, the current St. John the Baptist Church had become too small for the size of the congregation. The parishioner began demolishing the old church in March 1901. The original plans called for building the new St. Andrew on the same property as the old one. However, Reverend McCarthy, the pastor, wanted it located in a different property on Mariposa Street, close to St. Augustine's Academy. Despite the misgivings of some parishioners about the distance to that location, the parish adopted the pastor's plan. The cornerstone for the new church was laid in April 1902 and Coadjutor Archbishop George Montgomery from the Archdiocese of San Francisco dedicated it in June 1903.

In 1922, the Vatican erected the Diocese of Monterey-Fresno from the Diocese of Los Angeles-San Diego. The parish in 1926 opened the St. John Hall School.

At that time, St. John the Baptist Church became St. John the Baptist Cathedral. When the Diocese of Fresno was erected in 1967, St. John the Baptist remained as its cathedral.

In April 2019, Jose Hernandez approached the cathedral staff and threatened harm against the priests and bishop. After going outside, he broke several stained-glass windows and statues, causing $25,000 in damage. He was later arrested. The parish in November 2019 submitted plans to the city for the erected of an iron fence to increase security around the cathedral.

== Cathedral ==
St. John the Baptist Cathedral was designed in a Gothic-Romanesque style by the architect Thomas Bermingham. The structure has a triple-entry main door with a rose window. There are two square towers topped with spires.

== See also ==
- List of Catholic cathedrals in the United States
- List of cathedrals in the United States
