= St. Leon Cathedral (Burbank, California) =

Armenian apostolic cathedral

Coordinates: 34.20617°N 118.34163°W

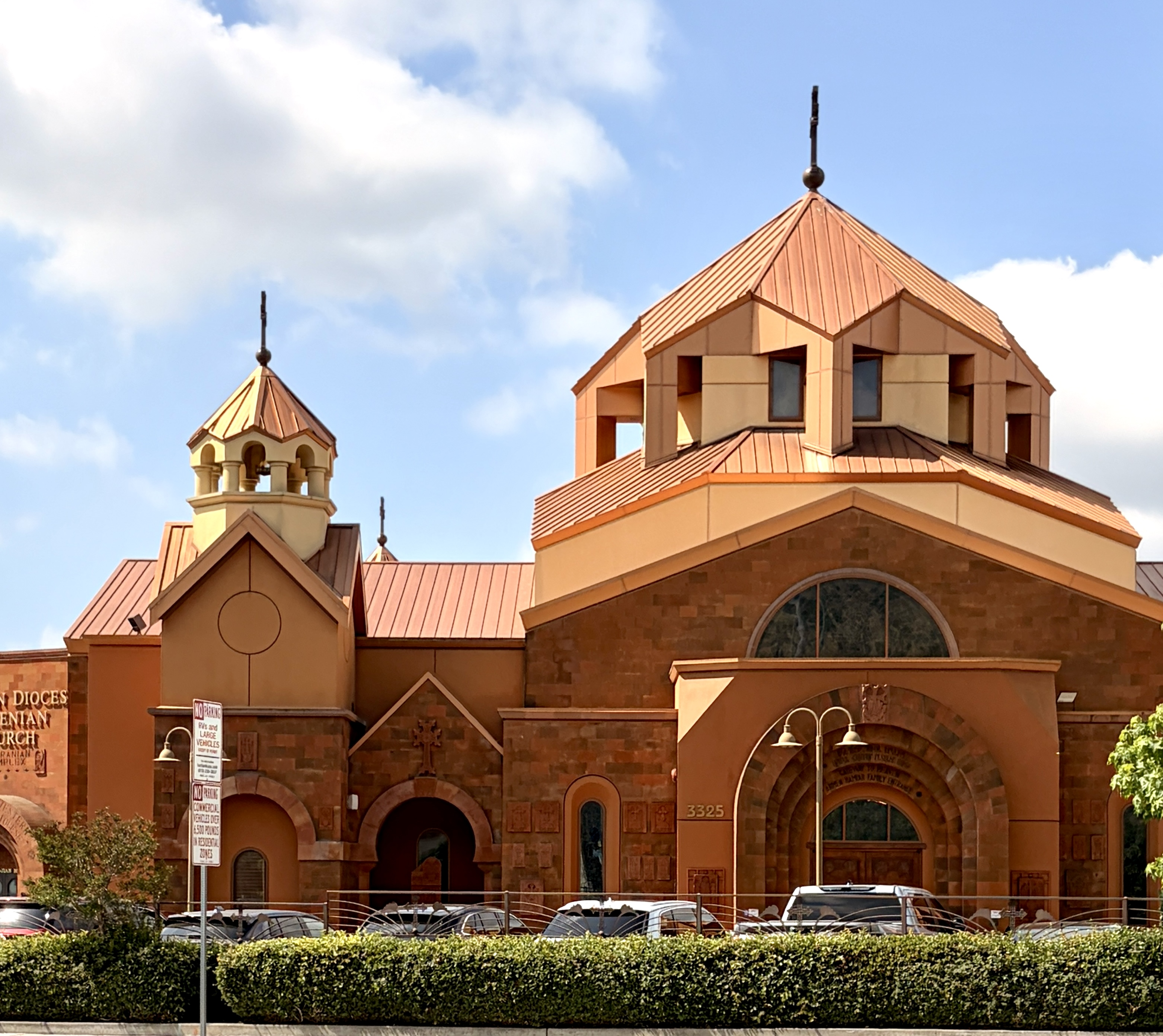
St. Leon Armenian Cathedral

St. Leon Armenian Cathedral (Armenian: Սրբոց Ղևոնդյանց Մայր Տաճար) in the city of Burbank, California, is an Armenian Apostolic cathedral that was built in 2010. The cathedral is home to the Armenian community in the Southern California area and is located directly across the street from Woodbury University. The cathedral was consecrated by Karekin II, Catholicos of All Armenians, on September 11, 2010. The cathedral falls on the northern side of Glenoaks Boulevard and is visible from the Interstate 5 freeway.
