= Melkite Greek Catholic Eparchy of Newton =

Eastern Catholic ecclesiastical jurisdiction in the United States

Coordinates: 42°17′51.03″N 71°08′03.7″W

Eparchy of Newton (Melkite Greek) Eparchia Neotoniensis Graecorum Melkitarum
- Coat of arms of the Eparchy of Newton

Location
- Country: United States
- Territory: United States
- Ecclesiastical province: Eastern Catholic Eparchies Immediately Subject to the Holy See

Statistics
- Population: (as of 2022); 35,000
- Parishes: 51

Information
- Denomination: Eastern Catholic
- Rite: Byzantine Rite
- Established: January 10, 1966 (60 years ago)
- Cathedral: Annunciation Cathedral
- Co-cathedral: St Anne Cathedral
- Patron saint: St. Nicholas of Myra
- Secular priests: 62

Current leadership
- Pope: Leo XIV
- Patriarch: Youssef Absi
- Eparchial Bishop: Francois Beyrouti
- Bishops emeritus: Nicholas Samra

Website
- melkite.org

Melkite Greek Catholic Eparchy of Newton (Latin: Eparchia Neotoniensis Graecorum Melkitarum) is a Melkite Greek Catholic Church ecclesiastical territory of the Catholic Church. The eparchy is named for Newton, Massachusetts, and encompasses the entire United States. There are currently about fifty Melkite parishes, missions, and "outreaches" in about two dozen states.

== History ==
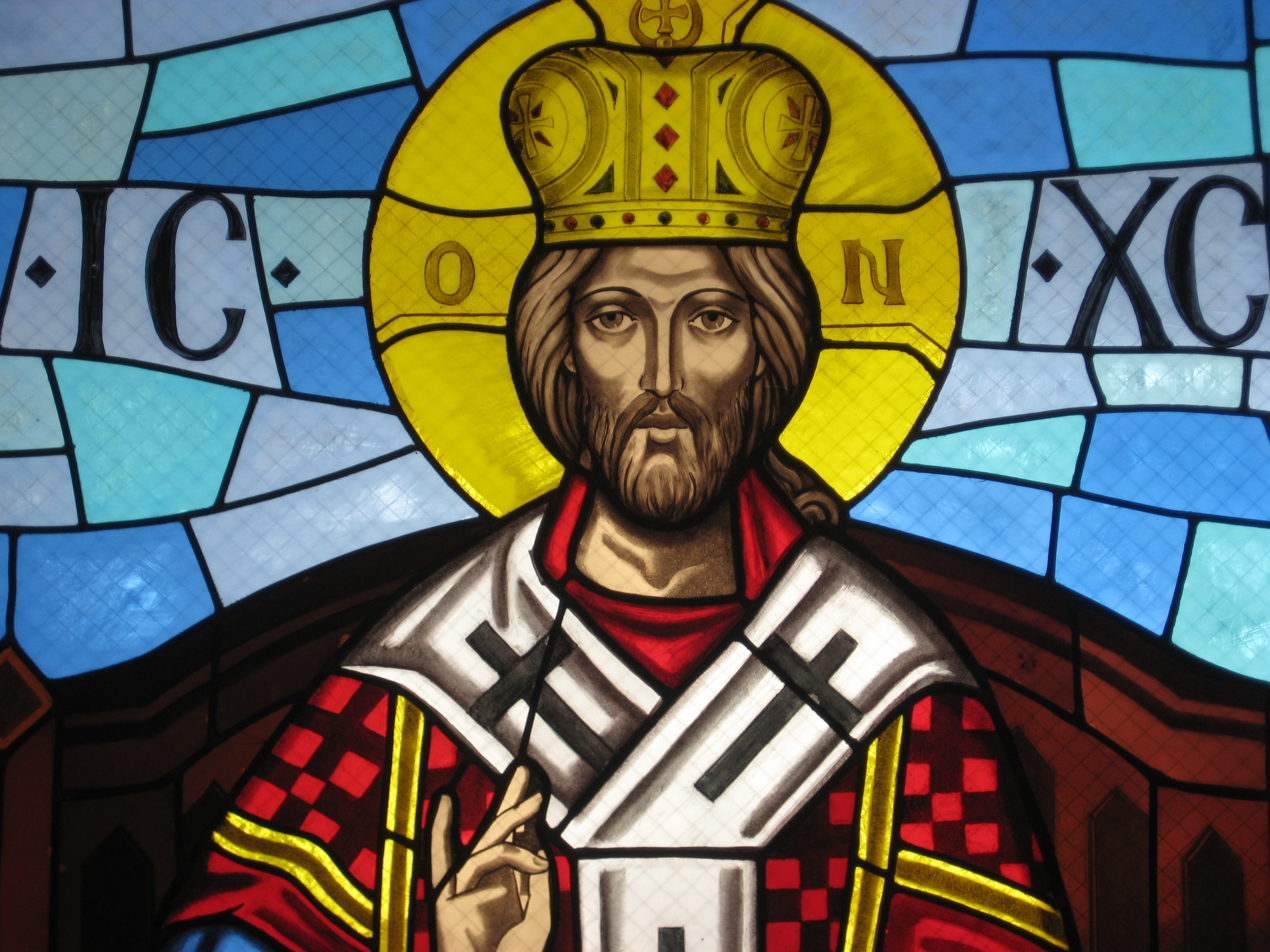
Stained glass window at the Annunciation Melkite Catholic Cathedral in West Roxbury, Massachusetts depicting Christ Enthroned in the regalia of a Byzantine emperor

=== Early immigration ===
The first large wave of Melkite immigration from the Middle East to the United States took place in the late 19th century, and the first American Melkite Catholic church was established in the 1890s. Because there was no diocesan structure for Melkite Catholic faithful in the United States at the time, Melkite parishes were individually under the jurisdiction of the local Latin Church diocesan bishop.

=== Apostolic exarchate ===
As the Melkite Catholic presence in the United States reached 70 years, to serve the faithful the Holy See erected an apostolic exarchate on January 10, 1966, with the title Apostolic Exarchate of United States of America, Faithful of the Oriental Rite (Melkite). Archmandrite Justin Najmy (1898–1968), pastor of St. Basil the Great Church then in Central Falls, Rhode Island, (the parish is now in Lincoln, Rhode Island), was appointed as the first Exarch by Pope Paul VI on January 27, 1966.

After Bishop Najmy's death in 1968, Archbishop Joseph Tawil, the Patriarchal Vicar of Damascus, was appointed Najmy's successor in October 1969, in a procedure the Patriarch described as a compromise.

=== Eparchy ===
On June 28, 1976, the Exarchate was elevated to the status of an eparchy, with the title Eparchy of Newton, and Archbishop Tawil became the first Eparch.

=== Later immigration ===
While the descendants of the earlier waves of Melkite immigrants to the U.S. became increasingly assimilated into American culture, the late twentieth and early twenty-first centuries saw, for a variety of reasons (e.g., economic, sectarian), new waves of Melkite immigrants hailing from traditional Middle-eastern homelands. Additionally, within the U.S., many older generations of Melkites began to retire and moving to Sun Belt states. These two phenomena help account for the growth of new Melkite missions and "outreaches." In some well established Melkite parishes new waves of immigrants saw a resurgence in Arabic, over English, as the primary liturgical language.

== Structure ==
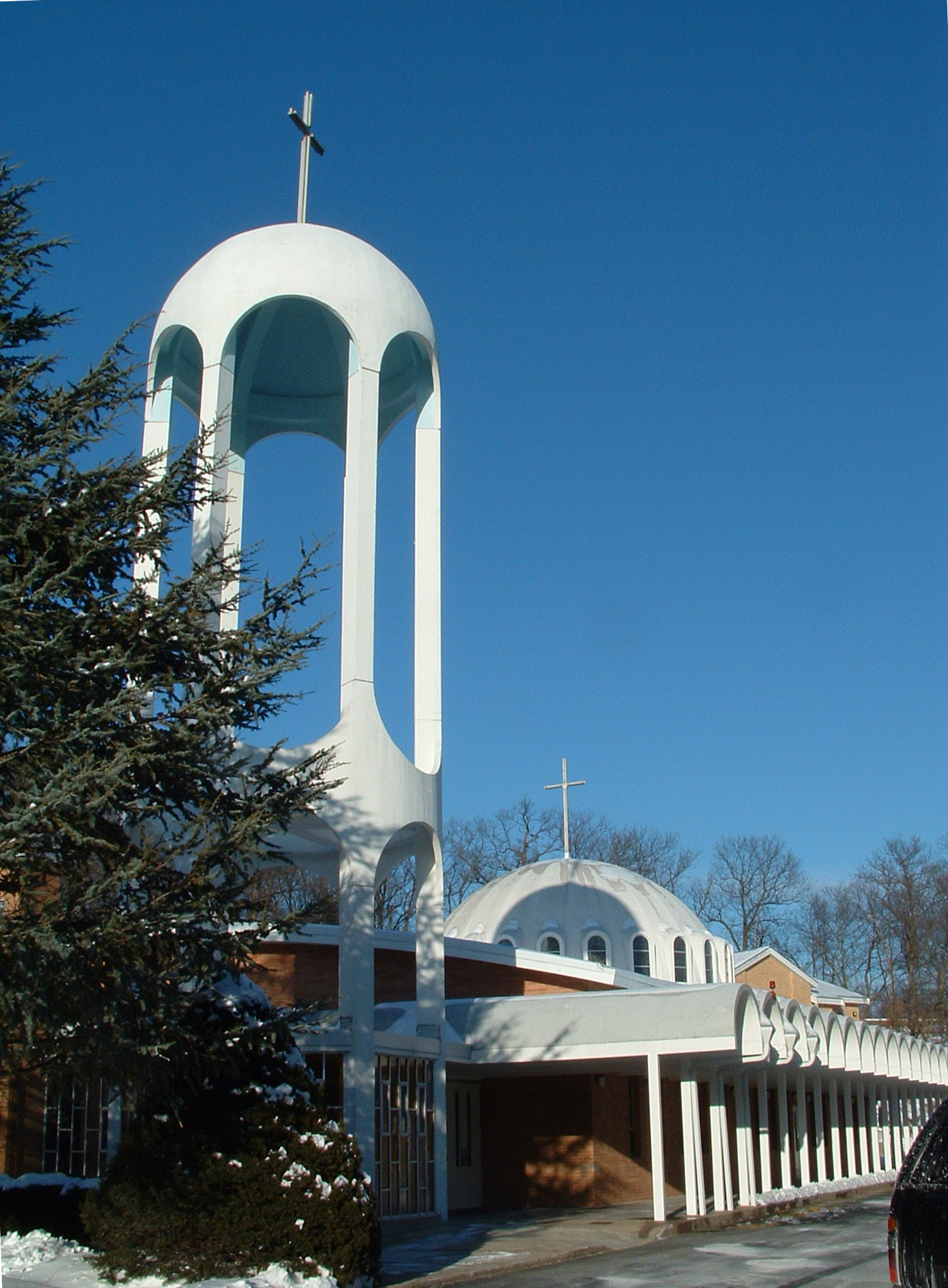
Annunciation Cathedral

The seat of the Eparchy is Our Lady of the Annunciation Cathedral in the West Roxbury section of Boston. The main offices of the eparchial curia (e.g, protosyncellus, chancellor) are located adjacent to the cathedral.

The Eparchy is named for the Boston suburb of Newton, where its offices and the bishop's residence had been located until Bishop John Elya sold to private developers two of the three major eparchial properties in the Boston area. In 2015, Pope Francis designated Saint Anne Church in Los Angeles as a co-cathedral. It is often home to Bishop Samra for several months of the year as he visits the Melkite churches in the western portion of the United States.

The eparchy has jurisdiction over all the Melkite faithful in the United States, and there are parishes, missions, "outreaches," and the like, in twenty-one states, none outside of the continental U.S. Most Melkite communities are concentrated in a handful of states or geographic regions (e.g., California, New England, Michigan, Ohio, Greater New York City metropolis). While the eparchy lists the number of parishes as 43, the additional missions and "outreaches" bring the total of Melkite communities in the U.S. to almost 50, each varying in size and level of vitality.

According to a research study published in Sociology of Religion, there were approximately 120,000 Melkites residing in the country in 1986, although only about 24,000 were formally enrolled in Melkite parishes. In 2013 there were 24,000 Melkite Catholics in 43 parishes. The United States Conference of Catholic Bishops reports that, as of 2018, there were 21,691 registered Melkites in the U.S., ranking it among the smallest 25% of Eastern Catholic groups. As of August 29, 2022, Bishop Nicholas Samra stated that there are about 36,000 registered Melkites with over 100,000 more of whom we do not know. The number of active Melkites is considered to be significantly lower, as it the case with most other religious groups, especially highly-ethnic denominations. The discrepancy between a large number of canonical Melkites in the U.S. and the relatively small number of Melkite parishes, as well as decreasing numbers of attendees in many of those parishes, suggest to some that Melkites are assimilating into other denominations or, perhaps, not affiliating at all. In fact, anecdotal evidence suggests that many Melkites whose first language is English become members of their local Roman Catholic parish. Some Lebanese and Lebanese-American Melkites have migrated to the Maronites. Other Melkites whose first language is Arabic migrate to Greek Orthodox and Antiochian churches. A few others, especially in larger metropolitan areas such as Los Angeles, assimilate into Arabic-speaking Mainline Protestant or Evangelical denominations. Many, especially younger, Melkites are "Nones".

== Seminary programs ==
In 1975, Archbishop Tawil founded a seminary program for the eparchy, after the Basilian Salvatorian Fathers—a religious order separate from the eparchy with a superior of their own and who had originally been charged with the formation of Melkite eparchial clergy—closed their program in Methuen, Massachusetts. Salvatorian students subsequently enrolled at Weston School of Theology, then in Cambridge, Massachusetts or John XXIII Seminary in Weston, MA. Eparchial students matriculated at Holy Cross Greek Orthodox School of Theology in Brookline, Massachusetts and received supplemental instruction from eparchial clergy. Both Weston and Holy Cross were members of the Boston Theological Institute, as it was known then.

In 1976, the eparchy purchased a house in Newton Centre, Massachusetts as a residence and house of studies for its seminarians, and named it St. Gregory Seminary. Eventually, Bishop John Elya sold the complex—along with the former chancery offices and bishop's residence in West Newton—to a private developer, at which time the chancery and bishop's residence relocated to an area adjacent to the cathedral.

Following ancient Christian tradition the eparchy counts among its clergy both celibate and married priests and deacons.

Most celibate eparchial clergy now study at the Byzantine Catholic Seminary of SS. Cyril and Methodius in Pittsburgh. Most of the married clergy study at various other Catholic schools of theology prior to their presbyteral ordinations.

== Other Offices and Functions ==
The Judicial vicar/Tribunal is located in Lansing, Michigan

The Economos is located at the chancery office.

Office of Educational Services is currently vacant.

Sophia Press publishes liturgical and prayer books, as well as biographies, histories, and other texts of Melkite interest.

OES Publications publishes booklets for sacramental preparation and spiritual development.

Sophia is the quarterly magazine of the eparchy.

The office of the eparchial Victim Assistance Coordinator (VAC) is contacted via a toll free number.

The vocation office is co-located at St John Chrysostom parish in Atlanta, Georgia.

There is a periodic national convention generally hosted by a Melkite parish, the last one held in July 2024 in Quincy, Massachusetts. The next convention is expected to be held in Ohio in 2026. Other eparchial groups (e.g., NAMY, see below) often hold national gatherings shortly before the national convention. There is also an annual clergy conference.

== Lay organizations ==
Bishop Ignatius Ghattas founded the Order of Saint Nicholas in 1991, a regional lay order attached to the Melkite Greek Catholic Eparchy of Newton. This program is a revitalization during Bishop Samra's tenure.

Melkite Ambassadors is an organization for those in their mid-20s to aged 40. It is for those "who want to participate in advocacy, catechesis mentorship, community life, community service, leadership development, and prayer".

Melkite Association of Young Adults (MAYA) is social and spiritual group for those who are aged 18 and at least one year out of high school to their mid-20s. This group is active at the local parish level and nationally when conventions are held.

The National Association of Melkite Women (NAMW) is open to any female aged 17 and older. This group supports Melkite seminarians and vocations.

National Association of Melkite Youth (NAMY) is a "religious, social, educational, humanitarian" group for Melkite youth aged 13 to 18.

Society of Publicans is a fellowship of Melkite faithful united in daily prayer.

== Bishops ==
=== Ordinaries ===
1. Bishop Justin Abraham Najmy (January 27, 1966–June 11, 1968); Exarch
2. Archbishop Joseph Tawil (October 30, 1969–December 2, 1989); Exarch until June 1976; then Eparch
3. Bishop Ignatius Ghattas (February 23, 1990–October 11, 1992)
4. Bishop John Elya (November 25, 1993–June 22, 2004)
5. Archbishop Cyril Salim Bustros (June 22, 2004–June 15, 2011)
6. Bishop Nicholas James Samra (appointed Auxiliary Bishop April 21, 1989; retired 2005; appointed Eparch June 15, 2011 - October 19, 2022)
7. Bishop Francois Beyrouti (October 19, 2022 – present; elected June 23, 2022, by the Melkite Synod and announced August 20, 2022 Patriarch Joseph Absi), episcopal consecration 12 October 2022, St Anne Melkite Greek-Catholic Co-Cathedral North Hollywood, LA)

Bishop Najmy through Archbishop Bustros all hailed from the Middle East, with Bishop Samra being the only American-born bishop. Bishop Beyrouti was born in Lebanon but raised in Canada.

=== Clergy serving in the Episcopacy on special assignment outside the Diocese ===
- Giorgio Demetrio Gallaro, appointed Bishop of Piana degli Albanesi (Italo-Albanese), Italy in 2015. He was appointed secretary of the Congregation for the Oriental Churches by Pope Francis on 25 February 2020 and given the personal title of archbishop. He held that position until Pope Francis named his successor on February 2, 2023.

== Other notable clergy ==
- Rev. Emmanuel Charles McCarthy, Advocate for peace and non-violence. He was ordained a priest by the Melkite patriarch in Damascus since, at the time of his ordination, it was uncustomary to ordain married Melkite clergy outside of the patriarchal lands. He is not a priest of the Eparchy of Newton but simply resides within it.
- Rev. Deacon Paul Weyrich (d. 2008), influential in conservative political circles and a co-founder of The Heritage Foundation, was a deacon in the Melkite church until his death in 2008.
- Rev. Alexei Woltornist, a former member of the first Trump Administration's Department of Homeland Security, associated with the Steamboat Institute, The Heritage Foundation, and Project 2025.
- Rev. Khaled Anatolios is the Theology Department Chair and John A. O'Brien Professor of Theology at the University of Notre Dame. His areas of interest include Early Christian Doctrine, Theological Method, and Biblical Exegesis.

== Parish locator ==
Parish	City	State
St. Joseph Melkite Greek Catholic Mission	Seattle	WA
St. George Melkite Greek Catholic Church	Birmingham	AL
St. John of the Desert Melkite Greek Catholic Church	Phoenix	AZ
Annunciation Melkite Greek Catholic Cathedral	West Roxbury	MA
Annunciation Melkite Greek Catholic Mission	Covina	CA
St. Barbara Melkite Greek Catholic Mission	Houston	TX
Three Hierarchs Melkite Catholic Mission	San Antonio	TX
Holy Cross Melkite Greek Catholic Church	Placentia	CA
St. Anne Melkite Greek Catholic Co-cathedral	North Hollywood, Los Angeles	CA
Melkite Greek Catholic Community of Lincoln	Lincoln	NE
St. Elias Melkite Greek Catholic Church	San Jose	CA
St. George Melkite Greek Catholic Church	Sacramento	CA
Virgin Mary Melkite Greek Catholic Church	Temecula	CA
St. Phillip the Apostle Melkite Greek Catholic Church	San Bernardino	CA
St. Paul Melkite Greek Catholic Church	El Segundo	CA
St. Jacob Mission Melkite Greek Catholic Church	San Diego	CA
Palm Springs Melkite Catholic Outreach	Palm Springs	CA
St. Ann Melkite Greek Catholic Church	Danbury	CT
St. Ann Melkite Greek Catholic Church	Waterford	CT
St. Jude Melkite Greek Catholic Church	Miami	FL
St. Nicholas Melkite Greek Catholic Church	Delray Beach	FL
Jacksonville Melkite Greek Catholic Outreach	Jacksonville	FL
St. Ignatios of Antioch Melkite Greek Catholic Church	Augusta	GA
St. John Chrysostom Melkite Greek Catholic Church	Atlanta	GA
St. John the Baptist Melkite Greek Catholic Church	Northlake	IL
University of Notre Dame Melkite Catholic Outreach	South Bend	IN
Our Lady of Perpetual Help Melkite Greek Catholic Church	Worcester	MA
St. Joseph Melkite Greek Catholic Church	Lawrence	MA
Our Lady of Redemption Melkite Greek Catholic Church	Warren	MI
St. Joseph the Betrothed Melkite Greek Catholic Church	Lansing	MI
St. Michael Melkite Greek Catholic Church	Plymouth	MI
Our Lady of the Cedars Melkite Greek Catholic Church	Manchester	NH
St. Ann Melkite Greek Catholic Church	Woodland Park	NJ
St. Demetrius Melkite Greek Catholic Church	Cliffside Park	NJ
Christ the Savior Melkite Greek Catholic Church	Yonkers	NY
Virgin Mary Melkite Greek Catholic Church	Brooklyn	NY
St. Basil Melkite Greek Catholic Church	Utica	NY
St. Nicholas the Wonderworker Melkite Greek Catholic Church	Rochester	NY
Holy Resurrection Melkite Greek Catholic Church	Columbus	OH
St. Elias Melkite Greek Catholic Church	Cleveland	OH
St. Joseph Melkite Greek Catholic Church	Akron	OH
Steubenville Melkite Catholic Community	Toronto	OH
St. Basil the Great Melkite Greek Catholic Church	Lincoln	RI
Holy Transfiguration Melkite Greek Catholic Church	McLean	VA
Southern Orange Country Area Greek Melkite Catholics at Saint Kilian’s Church	Mission Viejo	CA
St. George Melkite Greek Catholic Church	Milwaukee	WI
Las Vegas Melkite Mission	Las Vegas	NV
Our Lady of Mercy Mission	Allentown	PA
St. Joseph Melkite Greek Catholic Church	Scranton	PA
Dallas/Fort Worth Outreach	Watauga	TX
Mission Apostolate	Bakersfield	CA
Melkites of Annapolis	Annapolis	MD

== Religious orders ==
There is a community of the Basilian Salvatorian Order in Methuen, Massachusetts, with their own regional superior for the U.S. and Canada. There are currently several Basilian clergy serving in parishes of the eparchy. There is also one member of the Basilian Choerite community serving in the Eparchy. A small community of religious sisters, the Community of the Mother of God of Tenderness, is based in Danbury, Connecticut.

== See also ==
- List of the Catholic bishops of the United States#Other Eastern Catholic bishops
