= Joseph Tawil =

Syrian clergyman (1913-1999)

His Excellency, The Most Reverend Joseph Tawil
- Archbishop of Newton
- Church: Melkite Greek Catholic
- See: Eparchy of Newton
- In office: March 15, 1970—December 12, 1989
- Predecessor: Bishop Justin Najmy
- Successor: Bishop Ignatius Ghattas
- Previous post: Patriarchal Vicar for the See of Damascus

Orders
- Ordination: July 20, 1936
- Consecration: January 1, 1960

Personal details
- Born: December 25, 1913 Damascus, Syria
- Died: February 17, 1999 (aged 85) Newton, Massachusetts, United States

Joseph Elias Nicolas Tawil (December 25, 1913 – February 17, 1999) was a Syrian prelate who served as Eparch of Newton in the Melkite Greek Catholic Church from 1970 to 1989. He is remembered for his participation in the Second Vatican Council, expanding the Melkite Church in the United States, and articulating the unique role of the Eastern Catholic Churches in his 1970 pastoral letter, The Courage to Be Ourselves.

== Early life ==
Joseph Elias Nicolas Tawil was born in Damascus, Syria, the son of Elias and Malakie (Salman) Tawil. One of nine children in the family, he was raised in an observant Melkite family; his maternal uncles included Paul Salman, the Archbishop of Petra and all Jordan, and Archimandrite Clement Salman. He studied for the priesthood under the White Fathers in St. Anne's Seminary in Jerusalem. He was ordained as priest on July 20, 1936 and assigned to the Patriarchal College (Al Madrassah Al Batryakiyah) in Cairo, Egypt. For seven years he was a teacher and later dean of the institution. In 1943 he became president/headmaster of the college. He was raised to the dignity of archimandrite by Patriarch Maximos IV Sayegh in 1952 and appointed Patriarchal Vicar of Alexandria in 1954 with continued residence in Cairo as head of the college. Tawil continued to lead the Patriarchal College in Cairo until his appointment as Patriarchal Vicar of Damascus on August 29, 1959.

== Episcopate ==
=== Damascus and United States ===
Tawil was consecrated bishop in Damascus on January 1, 1960. While in this position he attended the Second Vatican Council where, as a representative of the Melkite Church, he worked with Patriarch Maximos IV to further understanding and cooperation between the Church of Rome and the Eastern Orthodox Church. In November 1967 Patriarch Maximos IV was succeeded after his death by Archbishop Tawil's friend and predecessor in the Cairo Patriarchal College, Archbishop George Selim Hakim, a native Egyptian who took the name Maximos V. Archbishop Hakim had been the first Archbishop of Nazareth and all Galilee and had been the guide for Pope Paul VI on his pilgrimage to the Holy Land at the beginning of his reign.

On October 30, 1969, Archbishop Tawil was appointed Apostolic Exarch for the United States by Pope Paul VI, and was installed on March 15, 1970. He succeeded Bishop Justin Najmy, the first Melkite bishop in the United States. Bishop Najmy had died only two years after his installation, and thus the major task of welding an efficient diocese out of the existing parishes scattered over the country fell to Archbishop Tawil.

Upon arriving in the United States Tawil was fluent in Arabic and French and proficient in Greek and Latin but did not speak English. He quickly learned English and published some of his most influential writings in the language of his new homeland.

=== The Courage To Be Ourselves ===
One of Tawil's first actions was to write the pastoral letter The Courage to be Ourselves to strengthen his flock, many of whom were relatively newcomers in this country and surrounded by the far more numerous Latin Catholics. The document, delivered as a Christmas 1970 pastoral letter, reminds Eastern Catholics of their rich traditions and how the Catholic Church benefits from diversity. In it he stated:

The existence of Eastern Churches as part of the Catholic family, although they have distinct customs and traditions in all areas of Church life, dramatically shows that to be Catholic one does not have to conform to the Roman model. Indeed, the Roman Church, as the [Second Vatican] Council affirmed, has learned many lessons of late from the East in the fields of liturgy (use of the vernacular, Communion in both kinds, baptism by immersion), of Church order (collegiality, synodal government, the role of the deacon), and spirituality. In a very real sense, the Western Church needs a vibrant Eastern Church to complement its understanding of the Christian message. By our fidelity to maintaining our patrimony, by our refusal to be assimilated, the Eastern Churches render a most precious service to Rome in still another area of Church life. Latinizing this small number of Easterners would not be a gain for Rome; rather it would block - perhaps forever - a union of the separated Churches of the East and West. It would be easy then for Orthodoxy to see that union with Rome leads surely to ecclesiastical assimilation.

=== Development of the Eparchy of Newton ===
Tawil founded the diocesan publication "Sophia" and in 1971 established a diaconate training program, the first in an Eastern Catholic diocese in the United States. He also established a Diocesan Pastoral Council. Later he inaugurated a Diocesan Communications Office, the National Association of Melkite Youth, and a full-time Office of Educational Services.

On June 28, 1976 Tawil was raised to archbishop. He was installed as eparch of Newton on February 14, 1977. During his tenure as eparch, Tawil founded eight new parishes and five missions. He ordained 26 new priests and 23 deacons. He also played a significant role in the founding a convent for women religious in Danbury, Connecticut.

Upon reaching retirement age, Archbishop Tawil assumed emeritus status on December 12, 1989, but remained active in church affairs despite the onset of Parkinson's disease. He was succeeded by Bishop Ignatius Ghattas as Eparch of Newton. Tawil died at Newton-Wellesley Hospital in Massachusetts on February 17, 1999.

== Books and other publications ==
Tawil published several books in both Arabic and English. They include:

- The Patriarchate of Antioch Throughout History: An Introduction. Sophia Press.
- The Sacraments of Christian Initiation. Theobooks.
- Saint Basil the Great. Sophia Press.

== See also ==
- Melkite Greek Catholic Church
- Eparchy of Newton
- Maximos IV Sayegh
