= Aleppians =

Aleppian or Alepian may refer to:

- Inhabitants of the Syrian city of Aleppo and their descendants
- Members of some Eastern Catholic monastic Congregations :
  - Basilian Aleppian Order, an Antiochian rite Order
  - Basilian Aleppian Sisters, the female branch of the Aleppian Order
  - Mariamite Maronite Order, an Antiochian rite
