= Pontifical Greek College of Saint Athanasius =

Pontifical College in Rome

Coordinates: 41.9081°N 12.4794°E

The Pontifical Greek College of St. Athanasius (Italian: Pontificio Collegio Greco di Sant’Atanasio; Greek: Ποντιφίκιο Ελληνικό Κολλέγιο Αγίου Αθανασίου) is a Pontifical College in Rome that observes the Byzantine rite.

It was founded in 1577 by Pope Gregory XIII as a college for the training of priests and seminarians who worshipped according to the Greek Eastern Catholic liturgies and disciplines. More recently, seminarians from elsewhere and other Byzantine Rite Eastern Catholic Churches have attended: Melkite Greek Catholic Church, Greeks, Albanians, Romanians, Bulgarians, Hungarians, Belarusians, Slovaks; in past centuries, before the establishment of autonomous colleges, also Ukrainian and Ruthenian students. It also hosted representatives of the Eastern Orthodox world.

Its patron saint is Saint Athanasius. The college Church of Sant'Atanasio is also a titular church.

== History ==
=== Foundation ===
Its foundation dates back to cardinal Giulio Antonio Santorio. As protector of the Basilian monks he set up a reformed congregation for the Italo-Albanian people of the Byzantine Rite in 1573, from which he developed the idea of a seminary for seminarians of the eastern rite, which opened in 1576 and was approved by Gregory XIII with a bull on 13 January the following year. The priests it trained were intended to oppose Turkish expansion into former Byzantine lands in the Balkans, Greece and in the Christian east in general, prevent the Protestant Reformation spreading there and help bring the Eastern Churches back into communion with Rome.

Between 1576 and 1577 the College was hosted by several houses in Rome, until in 1577 it found a permanent home on what is now Via del Babuino. Its students came from the Italo-Albanian Greek Catholic Church in Italy, Greece, the Arab dioceses of the Melkite Greek Catholic Church, as well as from Romania, Bulgaria, Hungary, Ukraine and Belarus.

=== Later history ===
The college was managed by the Roman Curia during the peak of the Curia's reorganisation by pope Sixtus V. From 1591 to 1604 it was managed by the Dominicans, then by the Jesuits and then from 1773 onwards by the Congregation for the Propagation of the Faith. From 1803 to 1845 no teaching took place at the College - instead, its students attended the College of the Propagation of the Faith (now the Pontifical Urbaniana University). In 1886 the college reopened under the management of the Resurrectionist Congregation, before shifting back to the Jesuits in 1890 and to the Benedictines in 1897. In 1919 it was put under the charge of the Belgian Benedictine community, headed since 1956 by Chevetogne Abbey. The current Pro Rector is the Rev. Fr. Thomas Bailey, OSB and the Rev. Fr. Gabriel Florian-Borzos is the Spiritual Director of the college.

== Rite ==
For many years the seminarians of the college only used the Byzantine Rite as opposed to the Latin liturgical rites, leading to constant disagreements with seminarians who used the Latin liturgy. The dispute was resolved by pope Leo XIII, who referred to pope Benedict XIV's 1755 encyclical 'Allatae Sunt', which repeated both rites' validity. He also pointed out that the college's church of Sant'Atanasio had four Latin altars and so both rites could be practiced on an equal footing.

== See also ==
- List of Jesuit sites

== Works of art ==
The college's collection of religious art includes works by Francesco Traballesi.
