= Francesco Traballesi =

Italian painter

Francesco Traballesi was an Italian painter and architect. He was born in Florence in 1541, flourished in Rome during the papacy of Pope Gregory XIII (1572–1585), and died in 1588 in Mantua, where he was working as an architect for the duke Vincenzo Gonzaga. In the Roman church of Sant'Atanasio dei Greci, which was founded by Gregory, there are two altar-pieces by Traballesi, an Annunciation, and a Christ disputing with the Doctors, while in the Greek Pontifical College of Saint Athanasius, next to the church, are more of his paintings, with Apostles, Fathers of the Church, and a Crucifixion, which were once parts of the iconostasis of the church itself. In the Town Hall of Tivoli, anciently called Tibur in Latium, are two frescoes painted by Traballesi in 1574, showing scenes of The mythic foundation of Tibur. After his wife died, he was ordained into the Dominican order. He had three brothers who also worked in the arts: Bartolommeo Traballesi (il Gobbo) was an assistant painter for Vasari; Felice was a sculptor, and Niccolo, a silversmith. Five of his sisters were nuns in the order of St Catherine.
