= Jean Abou Charouche =

Lebanese-born Agrentine Melkite Greek Catholic bishop (born 1972)

His Excellency, The Most Reverend Jean Abou Charouche S.M.S.P.
- Apostolic Exarch of Argentina
- Church: Melkite Greek Catholic Church
- See: Apostolic Exarchate of Argentina
- Appointed: 31 August 2026
- Predecessor: Ibrahim Salameh
- Other post: Titular Bishop of Myra of the Melkites
- Previous post: Apostolic Administrator of the Apostolic Exarchate of Argentina (2023–2026)

Orders
- Ordination: 16 August 1998
- Consecration: 31 October 2026 by Youssef Absi

Personal details
- Born: 18 October 1972 (age 54) Chiyah, Lebanon
- Education: Salesian Pontifical University

Jean Abou Charouche, S.M.S.P. (born 18 October 1972) is a Lebanese-born Argentine Melkite Greek Catholic hierarch who has served as apostolic exarch of the Melkite Greek Catholic Apostolic Exarchate of Argentina since 31 August 2026. On the same date, Pope Leo XIV appointed him apostolic exarch and elevated him to the episcopate, assigning him the titular see of Myra of the Melkites.

== Early life and education ==
Jean Abou Charouche was born on 18 October 1972 in Chiyah, near Beirut, Lebanon. In 1985, he entered the Minor Seminary of Saint Paul at Harissa, operated by the Missionaries of Saint Paul, where he studied philosophy and theology. He made his solemn vows on 29 June 1998 and was ordained a priest on 16 August 1998.

He subsequently pursued higher studies, obtaining a licence in philosophy and theology from Saint Paul in Harissa and a master's degree in spiritual theology from Salesian Pontifical University in Rome. He speaks Arabic, French, English, Italian and Spanish.

== Priesthood ==
Following his ordination, Abou Charouche carried out pastoral and formation work within the Missionaries of Saint Paul. His assignments included service at the congregation's major seminary, its centre in Ramallah, and responsibility for the novitiate and minor seminary at Ftayron, Lebanon. He later returned to Rome for further studies and worked on his doctoral thesis at the congregation's mother house.

In 2015, he moved to Argentina, where he became parish priest of Saint George Cathedral in Córdoba, the cathedral of the Melkite Greek Catholic community in the country.

== Apostolic administrator ==
On 14 January 2023, Pope Francis accepted the resignation of Ibrahim Salameh as apostolic exarch of the Melkite Greek Catholic Apostolic Exarchate of Argentina and appointed Abou Charouche, then parish priest of Saint George Cathedral in Córdoba, as apostolic administrator sede vacante.

He remained responsible for the pastoral administration of the exarchate until his appointment as apostolic exarch in August 2026. During this period, he served the Melkite Greek Catholic community throughout Argentina.

== Apostolic exarch ==
On 31 August 2026, Pope Leo XIV appointed Abou Charouche apostolic exarch for the Melkite Greek Catholic faithful residing in Argentina. At the same time, the pope elevated him to the dignity of bishop and assigned him the titular see of Myra of the Melkites. The appointment followed the election of Abou Charouche by the Holy Synod of the Melkite Greek Catholic Church, which was approved by the pope.

The appointment made him the head of the Melkite Greek Catholic ecclesiastical jurisdiction in Argentina, succeeding the period during which the exarchate had been governed by an apostolic administrator. The jurisdiction serves Melkite Greek Catholic faithful throughout Argentina.
