= Boutros Raï =

Boutros Raï BA
- Apostolic Exarch of Venezuela
- Church: Melkite Greek Catholic Church
- Diocese: Apostolic Exarchate of Venezuela
- In office: 19 February 1990 – 7 June 1994
- Predecessor: Exarchate erected
- Successor: Georges Kahhalé Zouhaïraty
- Other post: (Arch)Eparch of Nuestra Señora del Paraíso in Mexico City (1990-1994)
- Previous posts: Eparch of Nuestra Señora del Paraíso in Mexico City (1988-1990); Titular Bishop of Edessa in Osrhoëne dei Greco-Melkiti (1968-1988); Auxiliary Bishop of Antioch (1968-1988)

Orders
- Ordination: 26 June 1948
- Consecration: 10 November 1968 by Maximos V Hakim

Personal details
- Born: 8 November 1922 Aleppo, State of Aleppo, Mandatory Syrian Federation, French Empire
- Died: 7 June 1994 (aged 71)

Boutros Raï, BA, or Boutros (Pierre) Raï (born 8 November 1922, in Aleppo - died on 7 June 1994), was bishop of the Melkite Greek Catholic Eparchy of Nuestra Señora del Paraíso in Mexico City.

== Auxiliary Bishop of Antioch ==
Boutros Raï was ordained on 26 June 1948, as Chaplain of the Basilian monks. His appointment as Auxiliary Bishop of Antioch and simultaneously titular bishop of Edessa in Osrhoëne of Greek Melkites took place on 9 September 1968. Raï was ordained eparch on 10 November 1968, by Maximos V Hakim, Patriarch of Antioch, and his co-consecrators were Archbishop Neophytos Edelby, BA and Archbishop Georges Haddad. In 1983 he was appointed by Pope John Paul II Apostolic Visitor of the Melkite Church in Mexico and Venezuela.

== Melkite bishop of Mexico ==
His appointment as bishop for all Melkite Greek Catholic Christians living in Mexico was made on 27 February 1988. On 19 February 1990 Raï was appointed Archbishop "pro hac vice" and assumed duties as the tasks of the Apostolic Exarchs of Venezuela and the Apostolic Visitator in Argentina.

As Melkite archbishop Raï was co-consecrator of Bishop Nicholas Samra, titular bishop of Gerasa, who resided as auxiliary bishop in Newton, United States. As Bishop of Nuestra Señora del Paraíso de México, he served until his death on 7 June 1994.
