= Melkite Greek Catholic Eparchy of Nuestra Señora del Paraíso in Mexico City =

Eastern Catholic eparchy in Mexico

Coordinates: 19.4194°N 99.1456°W

Eparchy of Nuestra Señora del Paraíso in Mexico City (Melkite Greek) Eparchia Dominae Nostrae Paradisi in Civitate Mexicana Graecorum Melkitarum
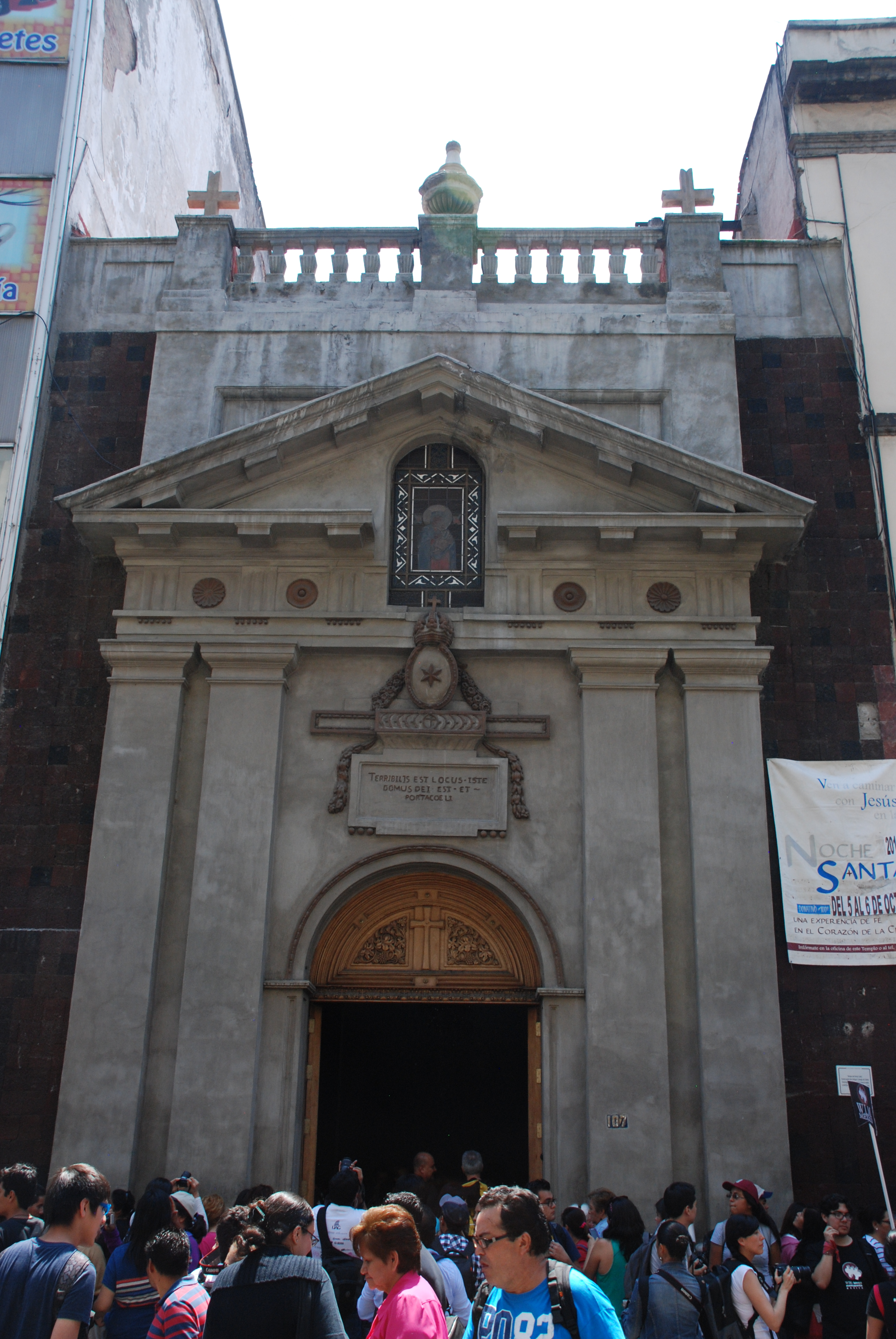

Location
- Country: Mexico
- Ecclesiastical province: Immediately Subject to the Holy See

Statistics
- Population: (as of 2004); 4,600
- Parishes: 1

Information
- Denomination: Melkite Greek Catholic Church
- Rite: Byzantine Rite
- Established: 1988
- Cathedral: Porta Coeli Cathedral, Mexico City

Current leadership
- Pope: Leo XIV
- Patriarch: Youssef Absi
- Eparch: Sede vacante (Joseph Khawam, BA, of Venezuela, as Apostolic Administrator)

Melkite Greek Catholic Eparchy of Nuestra Señora del Paraíso in Mexico City (Latin: Eparchia Dominae Nostrae Paradisi in Civitate Mexicana Graecorum Melkitarum) is an eparchy of the Melkite Greek Catholic Church, based in Mexico City.

== Territory and statistics ==
The eparchial jurisdiction extends to the faithful of the Melkite Greek Catholic Church throughout Mexico.

Eparchial headquarters is Mexico City, where the only parish of the eparchy, called Porta Coeli, is located.

The eparchy at the end of 2004 had 4,600 baptized.

== History ==
The emigration of Melkite Christians from the Middle East to Mexico began between approximately 1875 and 1895. It was followed by increased emigration after the two world wars. The vast majority came from southern Lebanon and some also from Syria. The first worship in the Byzantine rite was celebrated in 1927. The first pastoral care was taken by the Salvatorians. The first Chaplain Father Sleiman Khoury, from the Missionary Society of St. Paul (SMSP), a Melkite religious community, who remained at the request of his relatives in Mexico, and was granted the title of Archimandrite later. He was the first pastor of a parish for the Melkite Greek Catholic Church in Mexico. The Lebanese Ambassador to Mexico Joseph Abu Khater requested from the Mexican government planning permission for a church in Mexico City, today there is a cathedral and the seat of the Exarchate of Mexico, at Porta Coeli Cathedral, Mexico City.

The Eparchy of Nuestra Señora del Paraíso de México was finally erected on February 27, 1988, by Pope John Paul II by the Apostolic constitution Apostolorum Principis.

Following the sudden death of the Eparch Boutros Raï in 1994, four apostolic administrators have been named for this seat: the archimandrites Antoine Mouhanna (1994-2006) and Gabriel Ghanoum (2006-2015), the bishop Nicholas Samra (2015-2019), also serving as bishop of the Melkite Greek Catholic Eparchy of Newton, in the United States, and Joseph Khawam (2019-), also appointed as apostolic exarch for the Melkite Greek Catholic Apostolic Exarchate of Venezuela.

In November 2008 the VI Congress of the Melkite Greek Catholic bishops of the emigration was held in Mexico.

== Eparchs ==
- Bishop Boutros Raï, BA, (27 February 1988 - 7 June 1994 deceased)
- Archimandrite Antoine Mouhanna, 2000–2006 (Apostolic Administrator)
- Archimandrite Gabriel Ghanoum, BS, 2006-2015 (Apostolic Administrator)
- Bishop Nicholas Samra, 2015-2019 (Apostolic Administrator)
- Joseph Khawam, BA, 2019- (Apostolic Administrator)
