= Porta Coeli Cathedral =

Coordinates: 19°26′0.42″N 99°8′24.71″W

- Catedral de Porta Coeli
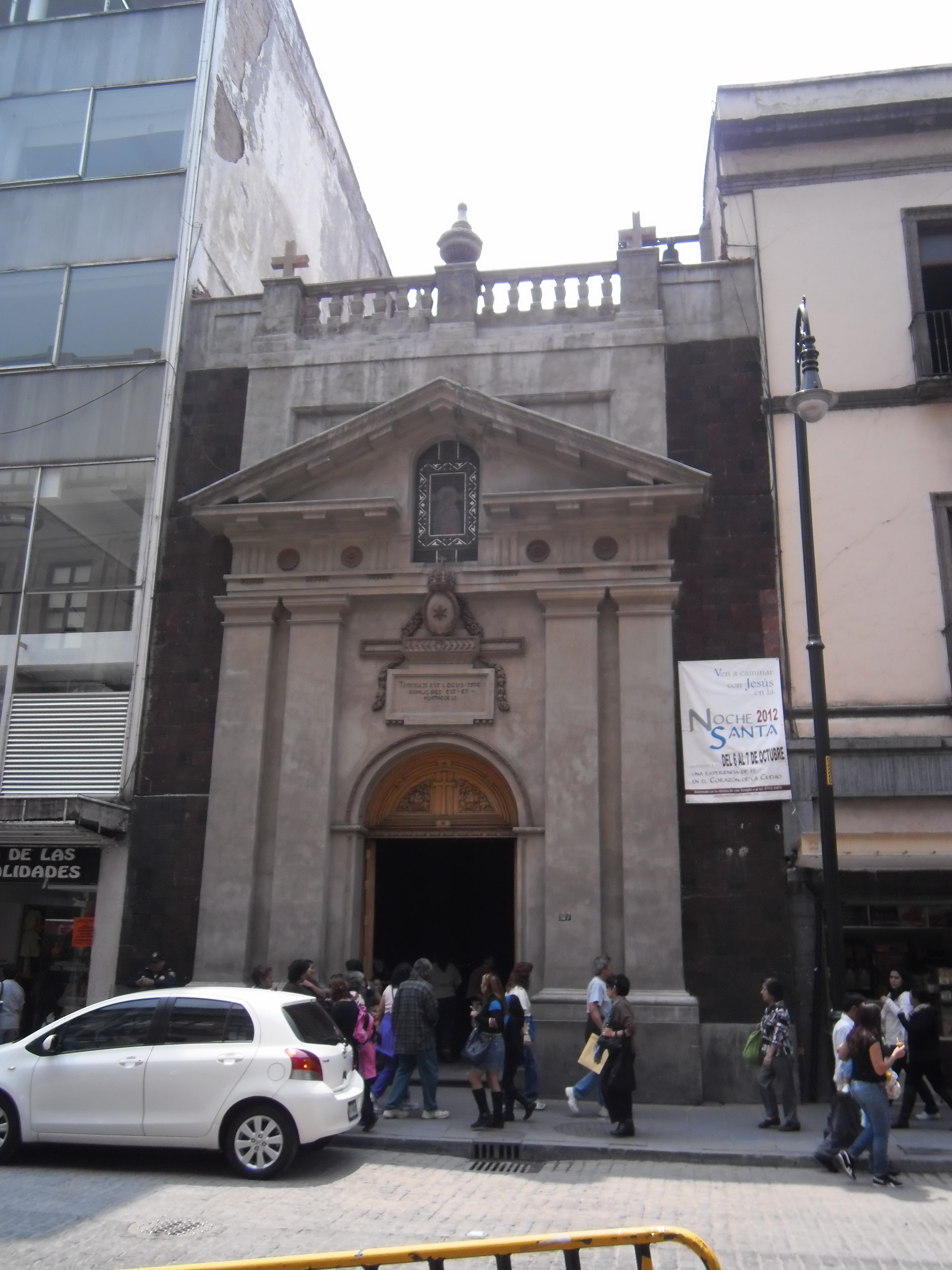
- Porta Coeli Cathedral
- Location: Mexico City
- Country: Mexico
- Denomination: Melkite Greek Catholic Church

History
- Founded: 1603

Architecture
- Style: Neoclassical
- Completed: 1711

Administration
- Diocese: Eparchy of Nuestra Señora del Paraíso

The Porta Coeli Cathedral (Spanish: Catedral de Porta Coeli ) also called Church of the Gate of Heaven or Church of Porta Coeli is a cathedral of the Melkite Greek Catholic Church in full communion with the Pope in Rome. It is located in Mexico City, the capital of Mexico.

The cathedral is the main church of the Greek Melkite Catholic Eparchy of Our Lady of Paradise in Mexico City (Eparchia Dominae Nostrae Paradisi in Civitate Mexicana Graecorum Melkitarum) which was created in 1952 to meet the religious needs of the local Melkite Catholic community. In fact, it is the only church of the eparchy.

The building was originally a Dominican church called Porta Coeli Church, founded in 1603. The building was completed in 1711, and is an example of Neoclassical architecture.

It was originally the church of the Dominican College of Porta Coeli, that came to occupy the entire block between the present streets of Carranza, Pino Suárez, Uruguay and the alley of Tabaqueros, the latter separating it from the Concepcionist Convent of Valvanera. Although the college was lost, the church we see today is preserved.

The church originally housed a miraculous Cristo Negro, known as El Señor del Veneno. In 1935, it was moved to the Mexico City Metropolitan Cathedral; the church retains an exact replica.

The interior of the church was renovated with eight Byzantine murals painted between 1970-1979. The mosaics depict the Annunciation, the Nativity, the Descent from the Cross, Pentecost, the Dormition, the Holy Trinity, Our Lady of the Light, and Our Lady of Perpetual Help surrounded by angels and saints.

The cathedral is under the pastoral responsibility of Bishop Joseph Khawam, who was appointed Apostolic Administrator sede vacante et ad nutum Sanctae Sedis of the eparchy by Pope Francis on 20 December, 2019.

Porta Coeli is one of four Catholic cathedrals in the city, the others being the Metropolitan Cathedral of the Ascension (Roman or Latin rite), the Iztapalapa Cathedral (Roman or Latin rite), and the Cathedral of Our Lady of Valvanera (Maronite rite).

== See also ==
- Melkite Greek Catholic Church
- List of colonial churches in Mexico City
- Porta coeli Convent

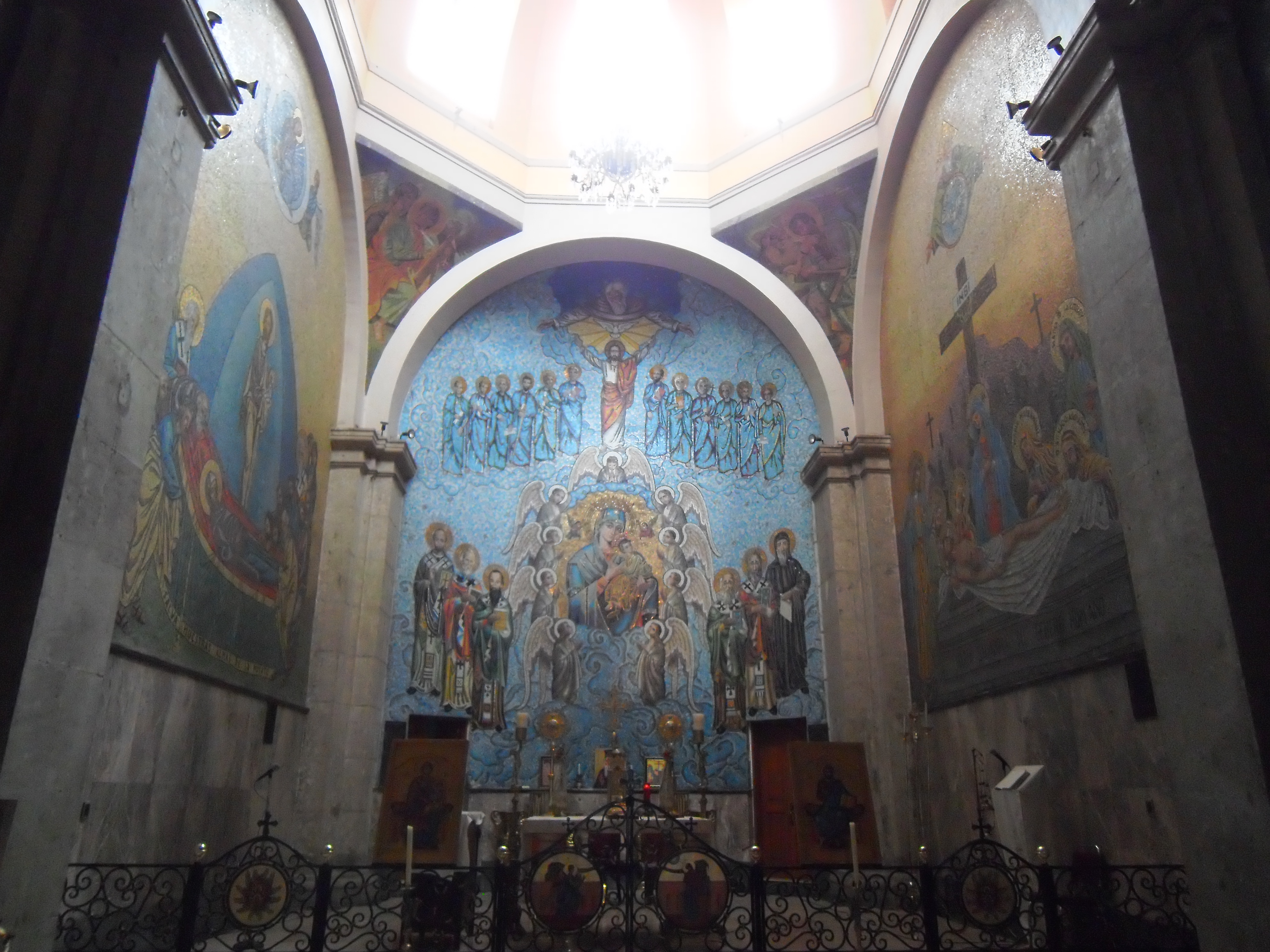
Internal View
