= Georges Kahhalé Zouhaïraty =

Georges Kahhalé Zouhaïraty BA
- Apostolic Exarch Emeritus of Venezuela
- Native name: جورج كحالة زهيرتى
- Church: Melkite Greek Catholic Church
- Diocese: Apostolic Exarchate of Venezuela
- In office: 12 October 1995 – 20 December 2019
- Predecessor: Boutros Raï
- Successor: Joseph Khawam
- Other post: Titular Bishop of Abila Lysaniae (since 1995)

Orders
- Ordination: 2 February 1966 by Hilarion Capucci
- Consecration: 21 December 1995 by Maximos V Hakim

Personal details
- Born: 1 August 1938 (age 87) Aleppo, Mandatory Syrian Republic, French Empire

Georges Kahhalé Zouhaïraty, BA (born 1 August 1938, Aleppo) is a Syrian-born Melkite Catholic hierarch, who served as Apostolic Exarch for the Melkite Greek Catholic Apostolic Exarchate of Venezuela, from 1995 until his retirement in 2019.

== Life ==
On 2 February 1966 Georges Kahhalé Zouhaïraty was ordained a priest of the Basilian Order. With simultaneous appointment as titular Bishop of Abila Lysaniae he received on 12 October 1995, the appointment as Apostolic Exarch in Venezuela. The Patriarch of Antioch Maximos V Hakim was the main consecrator on 21 December 1995 and the co-consecrators were Archbishop Elias Nijmé, BA from Tripoli (Lebanon) and Auxiliary Bishop of Antioch Archbishop Jean Mansour, SMSP.

== The Middle East ==
Bishop Georges Kahhalé Zouhaïraty was represented in October 2010 as a delegate to the Special Assembly of the Synod of Bishops for the Middle East. On the situation of Christians in the Middle East, he issued an opinion. In it, he said it was an important task of living in exile Christians to support the living in their home country and Christians in the faith. His exact words were: "We, the emigrants from Syria, Lebanon, Palestine, and - allow me to say it - Egypt, our country will always love you and stay close to our country and our origins. There are numerous men and women that can give the religious impulses and with scientific and economic generosity in the countries can be active, welcome us with open arms."
