= St. George's Cathedral, Caracas =

Melkite Greek Catholic cathedral in Venezuela

Cathedral of St. George
- Catedral de San Jorge
- Cathedral of St. George
- Location: Caracas
- Country: Venezuela
- Denomination: Catholic Church
- Churchmanship: Melkite Greek Catholic

Administration
- Diocese: Apostolic Exarchate of Venezuela

The Cathedral of Saint George (Spanish: Catedral de San Jorge), also known simply as St. George's Church, is a cathedral of the Melkite Greek Catholic Church in Caracas, Venezuela. It is located in the Montalbán zone at 3rd. Avenue Montalban 2 near the Francisco Fajardo Highway and the Guaire River, in the west of Libertador Municipality.

It is the seat of the Melkite Greek Catholic Apostolic Exarchate of Venezuela, which encompasses all of Venezuela. The Melkite Church is part of the Catholic Church in communion with the Pope in Rome, but observes the Byzantine Rite, and is to be distinguished from the Cathedral of Saint Anne, the cathedral for the Latin Church and houses the cathedra of the Roman Catholic Archdiocese of Caracas.

It is dedicated to Saint George (San Jorge), a Greek-Palestinian saint who by martyred during the Diocletianic Persecution of 303.

== See also ==
- Catholic Church in Venezuela
