= Nicholas Samra =

American bishop

His Grace, The Most Reverend Nicholas James Samra
- Eparch Emeritus of Newton
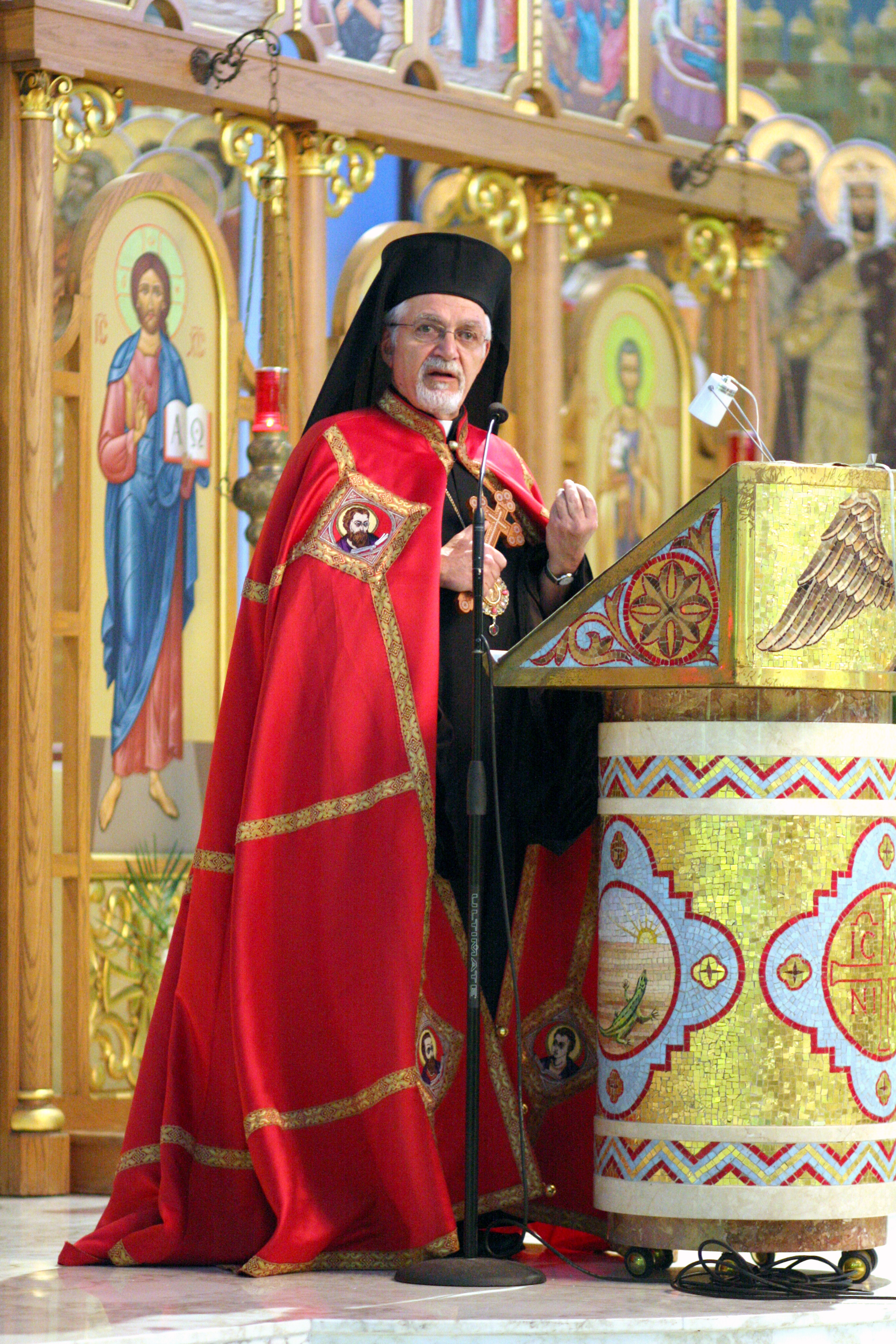
- Bishop Nicholas delivering a homily during a Memorial Service at a Ukrainian Catholic Church in 2008.
- Church: Melkite Greek Catholic
- See: Melkite Greek Catholic Eparchy of Newton
- Appointed: June 15, 2011
- Installed: August 23, 2011
- Retired: August 21, 2022
- Predecessor: Cyril Salim Bustros
- Successor: Francois Beyrouti
- Other post: Apostolic Administrator of Eparchy of Nuestra Señora del Paraíso in Mexico City
- Previous post: Auxiliary Eparch of Melkite Greek Catholic Eparchy of Newton and Titular Bishop of Gerasa (1989-2005)

Orders
- Ordination: May 10, 1970
- Consecration: July 6, 1989 by Joseph Elias Tawil, Michel Hakim, and Boutros Raï

Personal details
- Born: August 15, 1944 (age 81) Paterson, New Jersey
- Motto: Steward Of The Mysteries

Styles of Nicholas James Samra
- Reference style: His Grace; The Most Reverend
- Spoken style: His Grace
- Religious style: Eparch

Nicholas James Samra (born August 15, 1944) is a Syrian American prelate who served as Eparch of Newton in the Melkite Greek Catholic Church from 2011 to 2022. He also served as Apostolic Administrator of the Eparchy of Nuestra Señora del Paraíso in Mexico City from 2015 to 2019. Samra has written extensively on the subject of ecumenism and the Eastern Catholic Churches.

== Biography ==
=== Early life and priesthood ===
Samra was born on August 15, 1944, in Paterson, New Jersey to George H. Samra and Elizabeth Balady Samra. His grandparents and his father were immigrants to the United States from Aleppo, Syria. He was ordained a priest for the Eparchy of Newton on May 10, 1970, and served as a pastor in Melkite parishes in Los Angeles, Chicago and New Jersey. Samra earned the B.A. at Saint Anselm College, Goffstown, New Hampshire, and a B.D. from St. John's Seminary in Brighton, Massachusetts.

=== Episcopate ===
On April 21, 1989, Pope John Paul II appointed Samra to Auxiliary Bishop of the Eparchy of Newton and Titular Bishop of Gerasa. Archbishop Joseph Tawil consecrated and installed him on July 6 of that year.

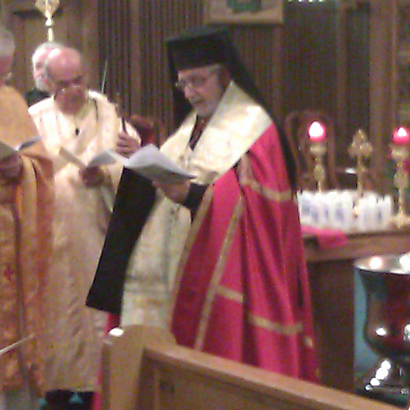
Bishop Nicholas Samra at Annunciation Melkite Catholic Cathedral, January 2012

Samra served as Auxiliary Bishop and Protosyncellus until he retired on January 11, 2005, to devote himself to scholarly work.

In June 2011, the Synod of the Melkite Greek Catholic Church nominated him as Eparch of Newton to succeed Archbishop Cyril Salim Bustros, and Pope Benedict XVI appointed him to the position on June 15, 2011. It was announced on August 20, 2022, that Samra will be succeeded by Bishop-elect Francois Beyrouti, elected on June 23, 2022, by the Melkite Synod.

On Friday, January 16, 2015, he was appointed by Pope Francis to serve also as Apostolic Administrator of the Melkite Greek Catholic Eparchy of Nuestra Señora del Paraíso in Mexico City, following the death of the former eparch until Joseph Khawam was appointed as successor on December 20, 2019.

=== Scholarly work ===
In October 2014, Samra presented "Eastern Catholicism in the Middle East Fifty Years after Orientalium ecclesiarum" at the conference "The Vatican II Decree on the Eastern Catholic Churches, Orientalium ecclesiarum - Fifty Years Later" organized by the Metropolitan Andrey Sheptytsky Institute of Eastern Christian Studies held at the University of Toronto.

An active speaker and author, Samra has written extensively on the subject of ecumenism, Christian leadership and stewardship. He has also published a multi-volume history of the Melkite Church and a book on the legacy of Archbishop Joseph Tawil.

=== Other activities ===
Samra is the past president of the Eastern Catholic Association of the U.S. Conference of Catholic Bishops. Having celebrated his 75th birthday on August 15, 2019, Samra submitted his request for retirement to The Holy See, the acceptance of which was announced along with the announcement that the Melkite Synod had elected Fr. Francois Beyrouti to succeed Samra.

== See also ==
- Catholic Church hierarchy
- Catholic Church in the United States
- Historical list of the Catholic bishops of the United States
- List of Catholic bishops of the United States
- Lists of patriarchs, archbishops, and bishops

== Episcopal succession ==
Catholic Church titles
Preceded by Cyril Salim Bustros	Eparch of Newton; 2011-2022	Succeeded by Francois Beyrouti
Preceded by -	Auxiliary Eparch of Newton; 1989-2005	Succeeded by -
