= Francois Beyrouti =

Eparch(Bishop)

His Grace, The Most Reverend François Beyrouti
- Eparch of Newton
- Diocese: Newton
- Appointed: August 20, 2022
- Installed: October 19, 2022
- Predecessor: Nicholas Samra

Orders
- Ordination: October 4, 1998
- Consecration: October 12, 2022 by Youssef Absi, Nicholas Samra, and Borys Gudziak

Personal details
- Born: July 3, 1971 (age 54) Hadeth-Beruit, Lebanon

Styles of François Beyrouti
- Reference style: His Grace; The Most Reverend
- Spoken style: His Grace
- Religious style: Eparch

François Beyrouti (born July 3, 1971) is a Lebanese-born prelate who has served as Eparch of Newton in the Melkite Greek Catholic Church since 2022.

== Biography ==
=== Early life ===
Beyrouti was born on 3 July 1971, one of three children born to Elias and Maggy Beyrouti in Hadath-Beirut, Lebanon. After emigrating with his family in 1976 to North Vancouver, British Columbia, Canada, he attended the Saint Thomas Aquinas Catholic High School.

=== Priesthood ===
From 1989 to 1993 he studied in the Christ the King seminary in Mission, B.C. He was awarded a degree and doctorate in biblical theology from Saint Paul University, Ottawa, Ontario. On October 4, 1998, Beyrouti was ordained to the priesthood for the eparchy of Saint-Sauveur de Montréal of the Greek-Melkites. From his ordination to January 31, 2010, Fr. Beyrouti served as pastor of Sts. Peter and Paul Melkite Catholic Church in Ottawa. He was incardinated into the Melkite Greek Catholic Eparchy of Newton and served as pastor at Holy Cross Melkite Catholic Church until his election and consecration as bishop.

=== Episcopacy ===
Pope Francis appointed Beyrouti eparchial bishop for the Eparchy of Newton on August 20, 2022. On October 12, 2022, Beyrouti was consecrated bishop and on October 19, 2022 was installed as the eparchial bishop.

== See also ==
- Catholic Church hierarchy
- Catholic Church in the United States
- Historical list of the Catholic bishops of the United States
- List of Catholic bishops of the United States
- Lists of patriarchs, archbishops, and bishops

== Episcopal succession ==
Catholic Church titles
Preceded by Nicholas Samra	Eparch of Newton; 2022-Present	Succeeded by Incumbent
