= Cathedral of Our Lady of the Dormition =

Coordinates: 33.5084°N 36.3163°E

Cathedral of the Dormition of Our Lady
- كَاتِدْرَائِيَّةُ سَيِّدَةِ النِّيَاحِ لِلرُّومِ الْمَلَكِيِّينَ فِي دِمَشْقَ
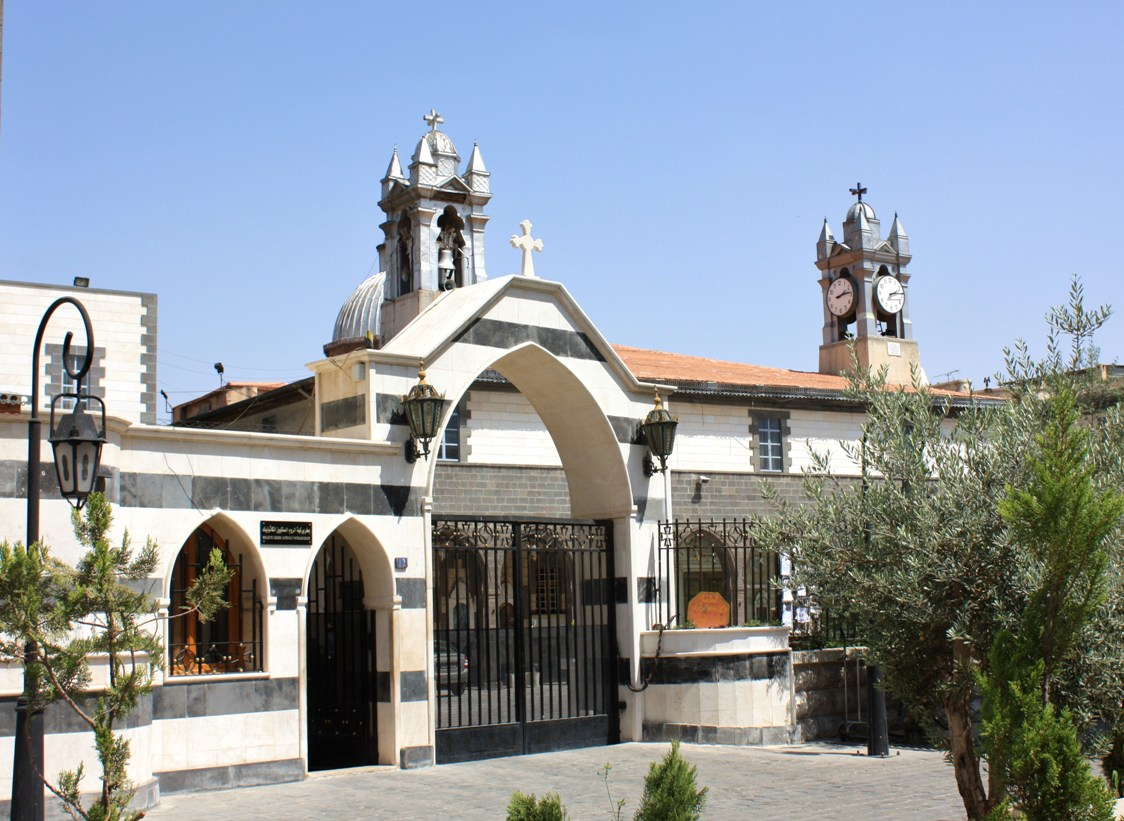
- Cathedral of the Dormition of Our Lady
- Location: Damascus, Syria
- Denomination: Melkite Greek Catholic Church

History
- Status: Cathedral

The Cathedral of Our Lady of the Dormition (Arabic: كَاتِدْرَائِيَّةُ سَيِّدَةِ النِّيَاحِ لِلرُّومِ الْمَلَكِيِّينَ فِي دِمَشْقَ, romanized: Kātidrāʾīyat Sayyidat an-Niyāḥ li r-Rūm al-Malakīyīn fī Dimašq), also known as Zaitoun "Olive" Church (كنيسة الزيتون Kanīsat az-Zaytūn) or the Melkite Greek Catholic Patriarchal Cathedral of the Dormition of Our Lady, is the cathedral of the Melkite Greek Catholic Church in the city of Damascus, Syria. It is the seat of the Greek-Melkite Archeparchy of Damascus (Latin: Archieparchia Damascena Graecorum Melkitarum) dependent on the Melkite Catholic Patriarchate of Antioch, which includes about 150,000 baptized adherents and twenty parishes with fifty priests. Its faithful, assigned from the 18th century to the Holy See in Rome, employ the Arabic language and the Byzantine rite.

The Archbishop Vicar (or Eparca) starting in 2006 was Youssef Absi, former Superior General of the Society of Missionaries of St. Paul. On June 21, 2017, he was elected as the Melkite Greek Patriarch.

The cathedral is dedicated to the Dormition of the Virgin, the Eastern Christian "counterpart" to the Latin Church doctrine of the assumption of Mary.

== See also ==
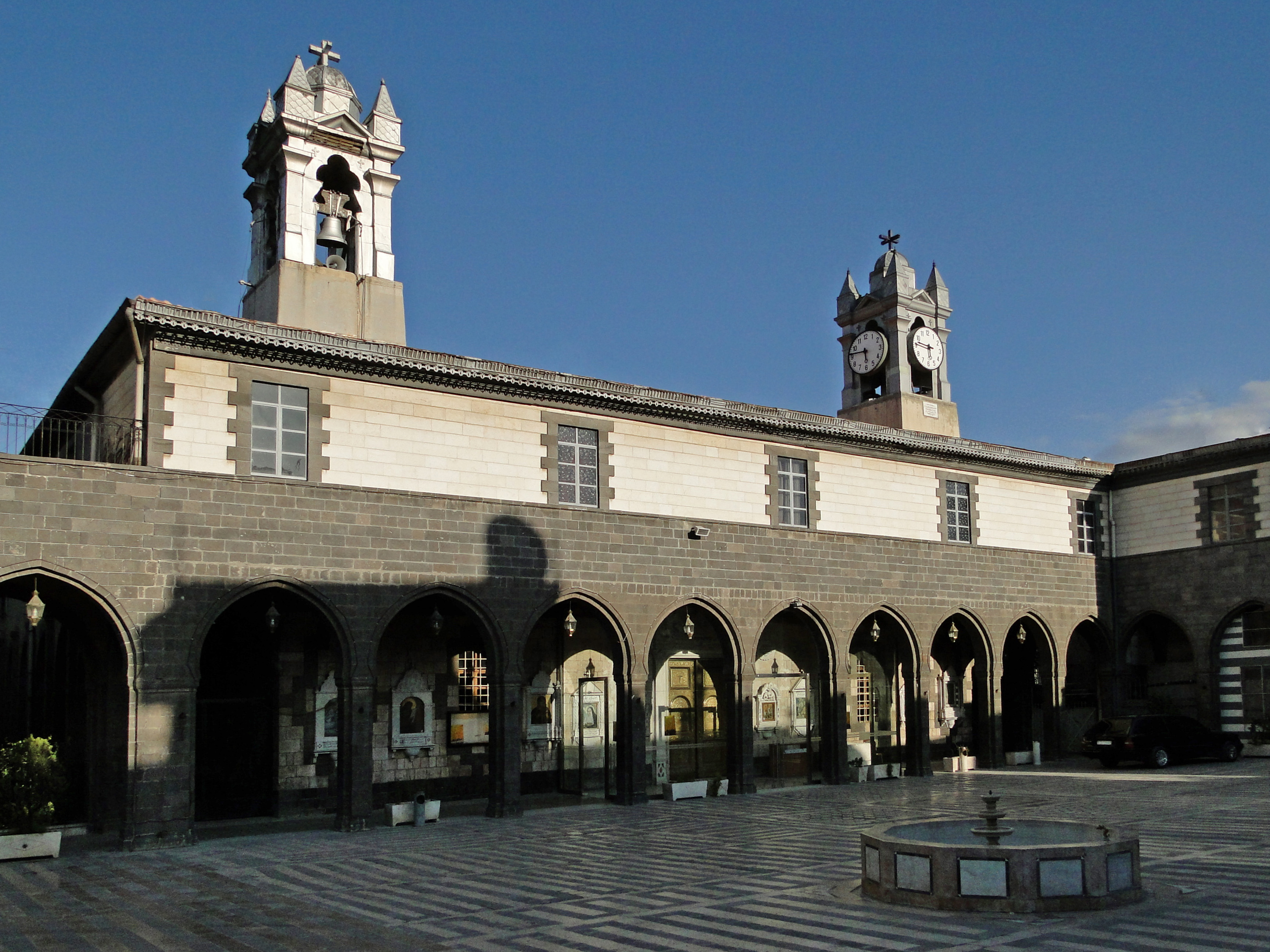
Another view

- Catholic Church in Syria
- Our Lady (disambiguation)
