= Elias Rahal =

Lebanese archbishop (born 1942)

Elias Rahal SMSP
- Archeparch Emeritus of Baalbek
- Native name: الياس رحال
- Church: Melkite Greek Catholic Church
- Archdiocese: Archeparchy of Baalbek
- In office: 28 June 2004 – 16 July 2025
- Predecessor: Cyril Salim Bustros
- Successor: Makhoul Farha

Orders
- Ordination: 28 June 1970 by Boutros Raï
- Consecration: 25 June 2004 by Gregory III Laham

Personal details
- Born: 14 April 1942 (age 84) Ras Baalbek, mandatory Lebanese Republic, French Empire

Elias Rahal, SMSP (born on 14 April 1942 in Ras Baalbek, Lebanon) is since 28 June 2004 the incumbent Archbishop of the Melkite Greek Catholic Archeparchy of Baalbek in Lebanon.

== Life ==
Elias Rahal was ordained on 28 June 1970 by Melkite Paulist religious priests. Rahal studied at the Pontifical Lateran University in Rome and attained a PhD from the University of Sagesse in Furn-El-Shebak (Lebanon) as Doctor of Canon law.

At the Synod of Bishops of the Melkite Greek Catholic Church from 22 to 26 June 2004, Rahal was elected to succeed Cyril Salim Bustros as Archbishop of Baalbek. The choice was agreed upon by Pope Benedict XVI on 28 June 2004, and the Patriarch of Antioch, Gregory III Laham, who consecrated him as a bishop. Archbishops Cyril Salim Bustros, SMSP and Jean Mansour, SMSP were assisted co-consecrators. Rahal was a participant in the Special Assembly of the Synod of Bishops for the Middle East which took place in October 2010.

== Works ==
The Pontifical Lateran University published in 2007 the written Elias Rahal's PhD thesis, in French: "Le Synode de l'Église Grecque Melkite Catholique tenu à Jerusalem en 1849 étude historique, théologique et canonique (Pontificia Universitas Lateranensis, Theses ad doctoratum in iure canonico)".
