= Joseph Khawam =

Melkite Greek Catholic bishop

His Excellency, The Most Reverend Joseph Antoine Khawam BA
- Apostolic Exarch of Venezuela
- Church: Melkite Greek Catholic
- See: Melkite Greek Catholic Apostolic Exarchate of Venezuela
- Appointed: December 20, 2019
- Predecessor: Georges Kahhalé Zouhaïraty
- Other posts: Apostolic Administrator of Eparchy of Nuestra Señora del Paraíso in Mexico City, Titular Bishop of Apamea

Orders
- Ordination: December 16, 1995
- Consecration: March 7, 2020

Personal details
- Born: April 14, 1968 (age 58) Aleppo, Syria
- Education: Pontifical Atheneum of St. Anselm

Styles of Joseph Antoine Khawam
- Reference style: His Grace; The Most Reverend
- Spoken style: His Grace
- Religious style: Exarch

Joseph Antoine Khawam, B.A. (born April 14, 1968) is a Syrian Melkite Greek Catholic hierarch who has served as Apostolic Exarch of Venezuela since 2019. He is also Apostolic Administrator of the Melkite Greek Catholic Eparchy of Nuestra Señora del Paraíso in Mexico City since 2019.

== Biography ==
Joseph Khawam was born in Aleppo, Syria, on April 14, 1968. In 1987 he joined the Basilian Aleppian Order. He studied philosophy and theology at the Pontifical Atheneum of St. Anselm. He made his solemn vows on August 5, 1995, and was ordained a priest on December 16, 1995.

He has served as rector of the minor seminary of the Aleppian order, as pastor of the Kib-Elias church and rector of the church of Notre-Dame-de-Zahle. Later he was appointed secretary of the eparchial presbyteral council of Zahle and a member of the eparchial committee for vocations. In 2007 he became Superior of the Convent of the Most Holy Saviour in Sarba and, from 2011 to 2019 he was Superior of the Convent of Saint George in Bmakine, Souk El-Gharb. In addition, from 2011 to 2015 he served as assistant general of his Order.

On Friday, December 20, 2019, he was appointed by Pope Francis to serve as Apostolic Exarch for Greek-Melkite faithful residing in Venezuela, following the retirement of the former exarch Georges Kahhalé Zouhaïraty. At the same time, he was appointed to serve also as Apostolic Administrator of the Melkite Greek Catholic Eparchy of Nuestra Señora del Paraíso in Mexico City, succeeding the American-born bishop Nicholas Samra.

He was consecrated bishop for the titular see of Apamea of Syria of the Greek-Melkites on March 7, 2020.

== Episcopal succession ==
Catholic Church titles
Preceded by Georges Kahhalé Zouhaïraty	Exarch of Venezuela; 2019-Present	Succeeded by Incumbent

== See also ==
- Catholic Church hierarchy
- Lists of patriarchs, archbishops, and bishops
