= Sant'Atanasio =

Church of Saint Athanasius
- S. Athanasii (in Latin); Sant’Atanasio (in Italian)
- Εκκλησία Αγίου Αθανασίου των Ελλήνων (in Greek); Ιερός Βυζαντινός Ναός Αγίου Αθανασίου (in Greek)
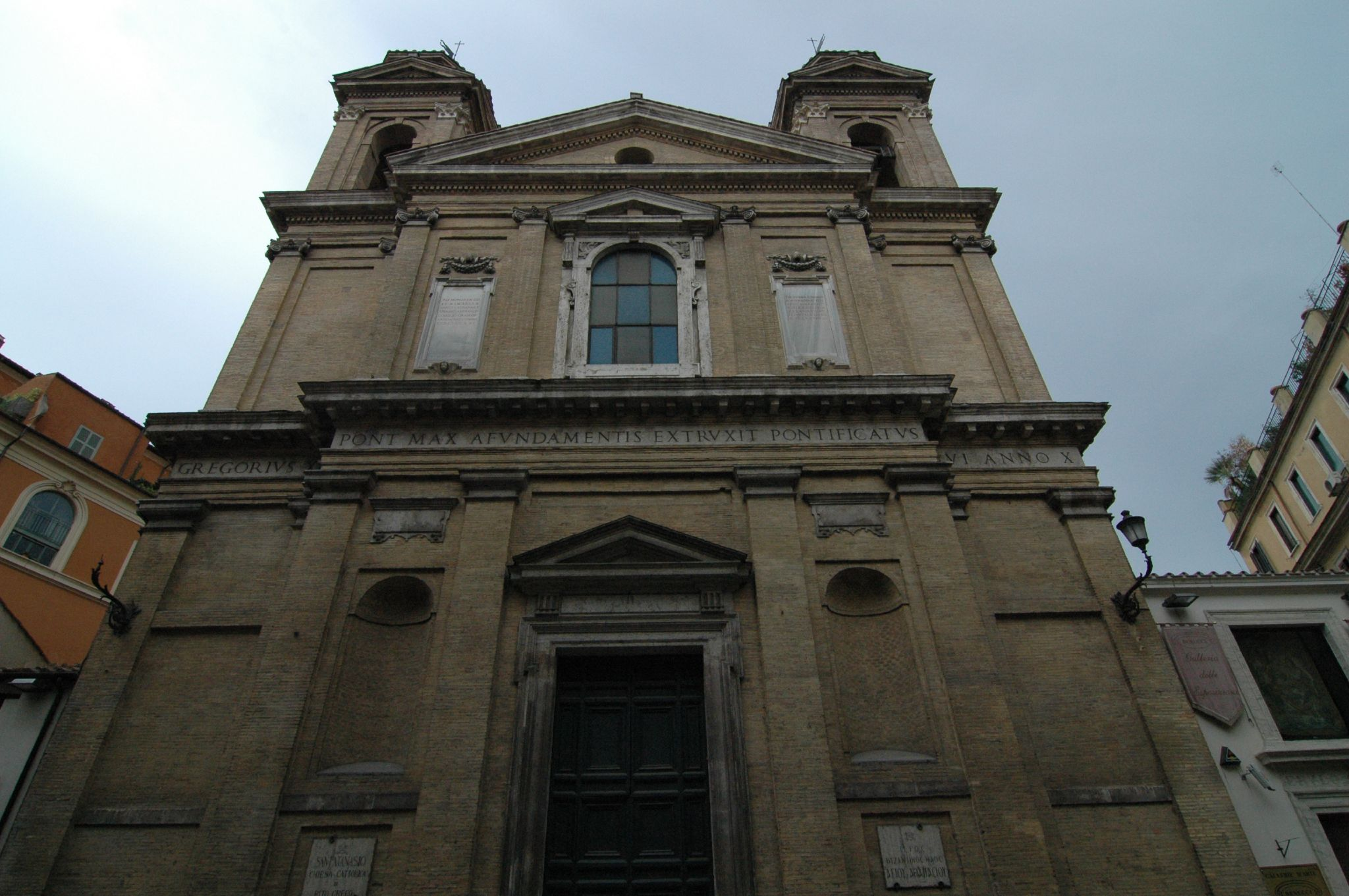
- Facade of Sant'Atanasio.
- Click on the map for a fullscreen view
- 41°54′28″N 12°28′46″E
- Location: 150 Via del Babuino, Rome
- Country: Italy
- Denomination: Catholic
- Tradition: Byzantine rite
- Website: Official website

History
- Status: Titular church, national church
- Dedication: Athanasius of Alexandria

Architecture
- Architect: Martino Longhi the Elder
- Architectural type: Church
- Style: Baroque, Neo-Byzantine
- Groundbreaking: 1580
- Completed: 1583

Administration
- Province: Diocese of Rome

The Church of Saint Athanasius (Italian: Sant’Atanasio, Latin: S. Athanasii), also known as Sant'Atanasio dei Greci (Greek: Εκκλησία Αγίου Αθανασίου των Ελλήνων, Ekklisia Agiou Athanasiou ton Ellinon), is a Greek Catholic titular church located on Via del Babuino 149, near the Spanish Steps, in the rione Campo Marzio of Rome, Italy.

== History ==
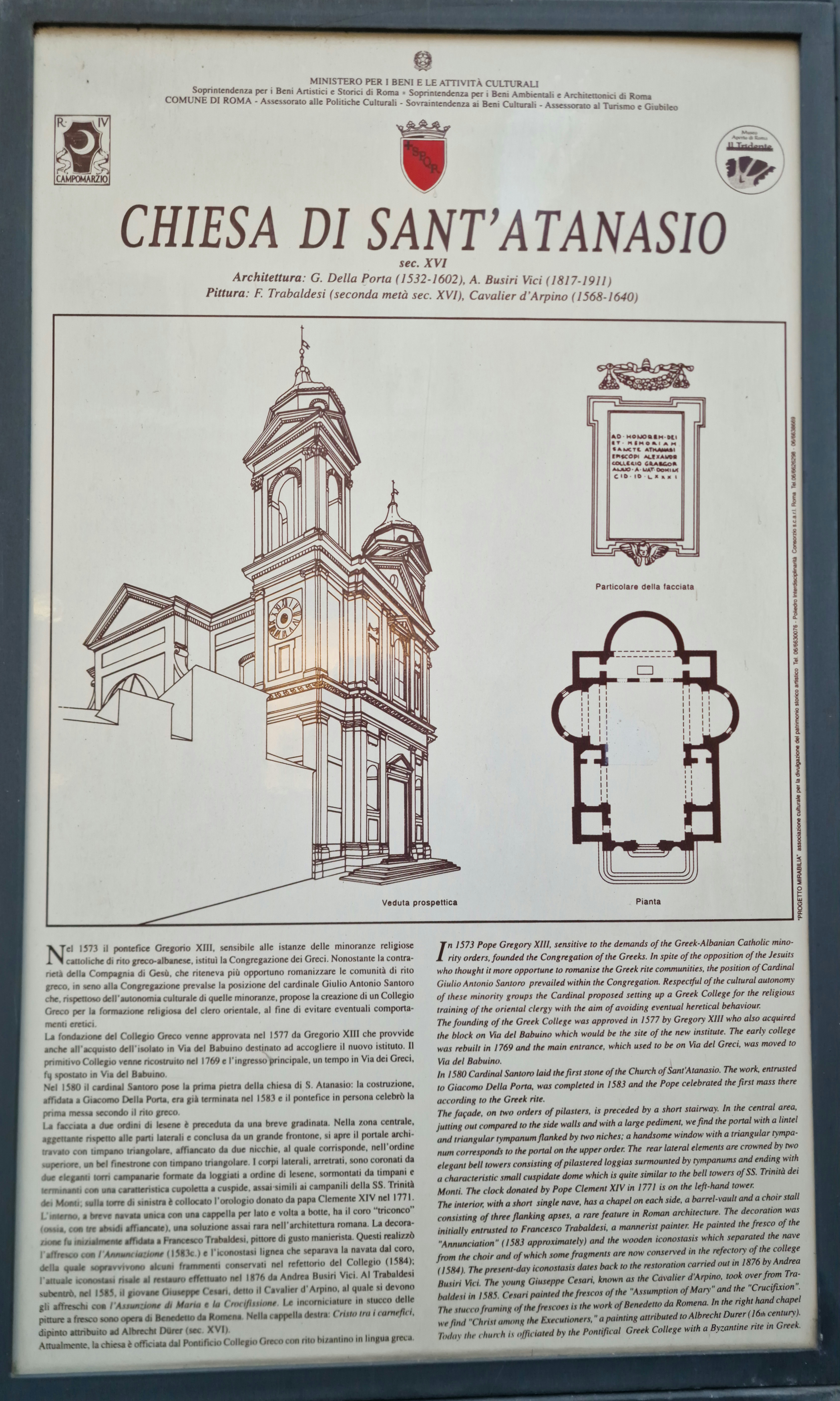
Sant'Atanasio plaque

In 1573, Pope Gregory XIII established the Congregation of the Greeks in response to appeals from the Greek-Albanian Catholic minority. Although the Jesuits opposed the move, favoring the Romanization of Greek-rite communities, Cardinal Giulio Antonio Santoro's perspective ultimately prevailed. He stressed the importance of preserving the cultural autonomy of these groups and proposed founding a Greek College to religious train the Eastern clergy, aiming to reduce the risk of heretical behavior.

The establishment of the Greek College was officially approved in 1577 by Pope Gregory XIII, who also acquired a block on Via del Babuino for its location. The original college building was later reconstructed in 1769 and its main entrance was relocated from Via dei Greci to Via del Babuino.

In 1580, Cardinal Santoro laid the foundation stone for the Church of Sant'Atanasio. Designed by Giacomo della Porta, the church was completed in 1583, when the Pope celebrated its first Mass according to the Greek rite.

In 1771, Pope Clement XIV donated the clock that still stands on the church's left tower.

In 1872 the church was entrusted to the Congregation for the Oriental Churches. On 22 February 1962 Pope John XXIII made it a cardinalitial titular church. At present the Titulus San Athanasii is vacant.

Today, the church is administered by the Pontifical Greek College, where services are conducted in Greek according to the Byzantine rite.

== Architecture ==
The main layout was designed by Giacomo della Porta, although the facade was attributed to Martino Longhi the Elder. The facade is placed between two towers covered with domes, which is divided into two horizontal bands by a marble ledge. Either side of a large window is written an inscription, one in Greek and the other in Latin in honor of Saint Athanasius of Alexandria. On the left stands a tower clock, donated by Pope Clement XIV in 1771, which faces the palace of the Pontifical Greek College.

The interior was frescoed by Francesco Tibaldi, and contained altarpieces by Cavalier d'Arpino. In the past, the library was said to hold the library of Leo Allatius.

== List of Cardinal priests ==
- Gabriel Acacius Coussa (22 March 1962 – 29 July 1962)
- Josyf Ivanovyce Slipyj (25 February 1965 – 7 September 1984)
- Lucian Mureșan (18 February 2012 – 25 September 2025)

In the 1963 novel and 1968 film, Shoes of the Fisherman, Ukrainian Kiril Lakota (modeled on Slipyj), Eastern rite Metropolitan Archbishop of Lviv, is appointed cardinal priest with Saint Athanasius as his titular church (before being elected Pope).

== Sources ==
- M. Armellini, Le chiese di Roma dal secolo IV al XIX, Roma 1891, pp. 339
- F. Titi, Descrizione delle Pitture, Sculture e Architetture esposte in Roma, Roma 1763, p. 381
- C. Rendina, Le Chiese di Roma, Newton & Compton Editori, Milano 2000, p. 40
- M. Quercioli, Rione IV Campo Marzio, in AA.VV, I rioni di Roma, Newton & Compton Editori, Milano 2000, Vol. I, pp. 264–334
