= Ibrahim Salameh =

Syrian Catholic priest (born 1945)

Ibrahim Salameh S.M.S.P.
- Apostolic Exarch Emeritus of Argentina
- Native name: ابراهيم سلامه
- Church: Melkite Greek Catholic Church
- Diocese: Apostolic Exarchate of Argentina
- In office: 15 August 2013 – 14 January 2023
- Predecessor: Jean-Abdo Arbach
- Successor: Sede Vacante
- Other post: Titular Bishop of Palmyra dei Greco-Melkiti (since 2013)

Orders
- Ordination: 13 July 1975
- Consecration: 27 September 2013 by Gregory III Laham

Personal details
- Born: 10 December 1945 (age 80) Marmarita, Latakia Governorate, Mandatory Syrian Republic, French Empire

Ibrahim Salameh, S.M.S.P. (born December 10, 1945, in Marmarita, Homs Governorate, Syria) is a former Apostolic Exarch of the Melkite Greek Catholic Apostolic Exarchate of Argentina.

== Life ==
Ibrahim Salameh joined to the Missionary Society of Saint Paul and received on 13 July 1975 the sacrament of Holy Orders.

On August 15, 2013 Pope Francis appointed him titular bishop of Palmyra of Greek Melkites and named him to the Melkite Apostolic Exarchate of Argentina. The Melkite Greek Catholic Patriarch of Antioch, Gregory III Laham, BS, gave him on September 28 of the same year, the episcopal ordination, and his co-consecrators were the Archbishop of Beirut and Byblos, Cyril Salim Bustros SMSP, and the Archbishop of Baalbek, Elias Rahal, SMSP.
