= Makhoul Farha =

Lebanese Melkite Greek Catholic archbishop (born 1959)

The Most Reverend Makhoul Farha, OCD
- Archbishop of Baalbek
- Church: Melkite Greek Catholic Church
- Diocese: Baalbek
- Appointed: 16 July 2025
- Predecessor: Elias Rahal
- Previous post: General Delegate of the Discalced Carmelites in Egypt (2020–2025)

Orders
- Ordination: 14 July 1984
- Consecration: 24 August 2025 by Youssef Absi

Personal details
- Born: 28 December 1959 (age 66) Ras Baalbek, Lebanon
- Education: Pontifical Urban University

Makhoul Farha OCD (born 28 December 1959) is a Lebanese Melkite Catholic hierarch, who has served as the Archbishop of the Melkite Greek Catholic Archeparchy of Baalbek since 2025.

== Early life and education ==
Farha was born on 28 December 1959 in Ras Baalbek, a town in the Beqaa Governorate of Lebanon. Feeling a religious vocation, he entered the religious order of the Discalced Carmelites (OCD) in 1974. He made his simple vows on 15 August 1975 and his solemn profession on 15 August 1983.

After he completed his philosophical and theological studies, Farha was ordained a priest on 14 July 1984. Later he obtained a licentiate in a canon law from the Pontifical Urban University in Rome in 1988.

== Priestly ministry ==
Following his ordination, Farha served in a variety of pastoral, educational, and administrative roles within his religious order, splitting his time primarily between Lebanon and Egypt. During his early ministry, he dedicated himself to formation as the master of postulants and novices, helping guide new vocations into the Carmelite order. He later transitioned into educational leadership, serving as the Director of the Carmelite School in Tripoli, Lebanon.

Farha's ministry eventually expanded into Egypt, where he was appointed Superior of the Carmelite community in Alexandria. He took on broader administrative responsibilities for the region as a counselor and Provincial Vicar of the Carmelite Delegation. In June 2021, he was named General Delegate (Provincial Superior) of the Discalced Carmelite Friars in Egypt. In this leadership capacity, he managed the order's network of schools, parishes, and spiritual centers, while actively working to strengthen local ecumenical ties and elevate educational standards across their institutions.

== Episcopate ==
The Synod of Bishops of the Melkite Greek Catholic Church elected Farha to succeed the retiring Archbishop Elias Rahal as the Archbishop of Baalbek. Following the assent of Pope Leo XIV, the election was officially announced by the Holy See on 16 July 2025. He was consecrated as a bishop on 24 August 2025 at the Basilica of Saint Paul in Harissa-Daraoun by Patriarch Youssef Absi.
