= Melkite Greek Catholic Apostolic Exarchate of Venezuela =

Melkite Catholic ecclesiastical jurisdiction in Venezuela

Apostolic Exarchate of Venezuela (Melkite Greek) Exarchatus Apostolicus Caracensis Graecorum Melkitarum

Location
- Country: Venezuela
- Ecclesiastical province: Immediately exempt to the Holy See

Statistics
- Population: (as of 2010); 25,000
- Parishes: 5

Information
- Denomination: Catholic Church
- Sui iuris church: Melkite Greek Catholic Church
- Rite: Byzantine Rite
- Established: 19 February 1990 (36 years ago)
- Cathedral: Catedral San Jorge

Current leadership
- Pope: Leo XIV
- Patriarch: Youssef Absi
- Exarch: Joseph Khawam, B.A.
- Bishops emeritus: Georges Kahhalé Zouhaïraty, B.A.

Website
- www.catedralsanjorge.org.ve

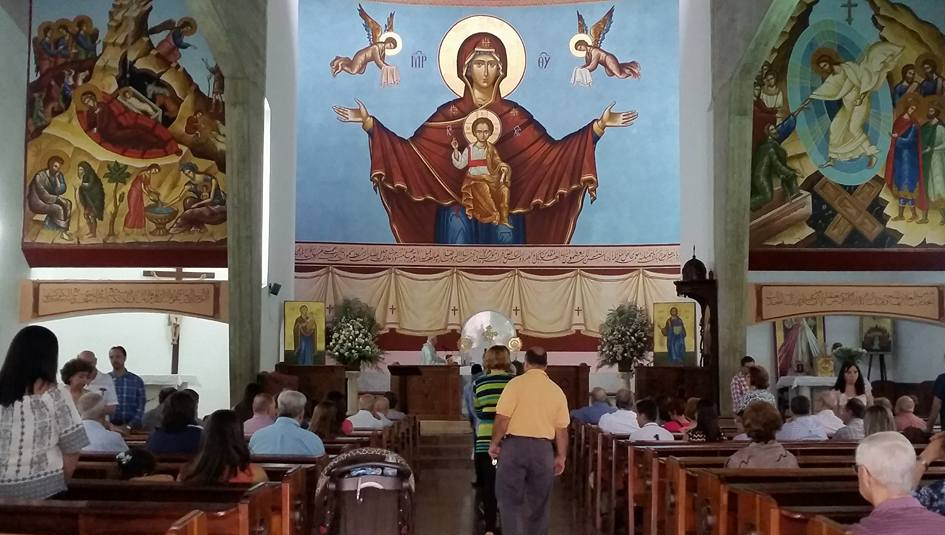
St. George's Catholic melquite Cathedral, Caracas city Venezuela

Melkite Greek Catholic Apostolic Exarchate of Venezuela (in Latin: Exarchatus Apostolicus Caracensis Graecorum Melkitarum, meaning - of Caracas) is a Melkite Greek Catholic Church missionary pre-diocesan jurisdiction or apostolic exarchate of the Catholic Church in Venezuela.

The apostolic exarchate is immediately exempt to the Holy See (notably the Congregation for the Oriental Churches) and not part of any (Melkite or Latin) ecclesiastical province, and encompasses the entirety of Venezuela.

The exarch's cathedral is the Cathedral of St. George, in the episcopal see and national capital city Caracas, which also has the see of the Latin metropolitan Archdiocese of Caracas, Santiago de Venezuela.

== Territory and statistics ==
The apostolic exarchate extends to all the faithful of the Melkite Greek Catholic Church in Venezuela.

The territory is divided into five parishes and had 25,000 Melkite Catholics in 2010.

== History ==
Melkite Catholic immigration in Venezuela, especially from Aleppo in Syria, dates back to the early decades of the twentieth century and intensified in particular between the two world wars.

In 1957 for the first time, a priest of the Society of the Missionaries of St. Paul, Gabriel Dick, took pastoral care of the Melkite community in the country.

The Apostolic Exarchate of Venezuela was erected on 19 February 1990 with the papal bull Quo longius of Pope John Paul II.

== Incumbent apostolic exarchs ==
Conforming to the Eastern tradition, ordinaries are generally monks, so far all of the Basilian Aleppian Order (B.A.)

- Boutros Raï, B.A. (19 February 1990 – 7 June 1994 Died)
- Georges Kahhalé Zouhaïraty, B.A. (12 October 1995 – 20 December 2019 Retired)
- Joseph Antoine Khawam, B.A. (20 December 2019 – present)

== See also ==
- Roman Catholicism in Venezuela

== Sources and external links ==
- GigaCatholic, with ordinary biography links
- http://www.pgc-lb.org/fre/melkite_greek_catholic_church/Apostolic-Exarchate-of-Venezuela*
