= Melkite Greek Catholic Apostolic Exarchate of Argentina =

Eastern Catholic missionary jurisdiction in Argentina

Apostolic Exarchate of Argentina (Melkite Greek)

Location
- Country: Argentina

Statistics
- Population: (as of 2023); 339,125
- Parishes: 3

Information
- Denomination: Melkite Greek Catholic Church
- Rite: Byzantine Rite
- Established: 21 March 2002
- Cathedral: Saint George Cathedral

Current leadership
- Pope: Leo XIV
- Patriarch: Youssef Absi
- Apostolic Exarch Emeritus: Jean Abou Charouche, S.M.S.P.

Melkite Greek Catholic Apostolic Exarchate of Argentina is an Apostolic Exarchate (missionary pre-diocesan jurisdiction) of the Melkite Greek Catholic Church covering all of Argentina for its Byzantine Rite.

It is immediately subject to the Melkite Catholic Patriarchate of Antioch. It is currently governed by Jean Abou Charouche, SMSP.

== Territory and statistics ==
Apostolic Exarchate to the Melkites has jurisdiction over all the faithful of the Melkite Greek Catholic Church in Argentina. Its cathedral episcopal see is the Cathedral of Saint George in the city of Córdoba, Argentina. In 2023 there were 339,125 baptized.

=== Parishes ===
The territory is divided into three parishes:

- Saint George Cathedral, Cordoba
- Saint George Church, Rosario
- Our Lady of Perpetual Help Church, Buenos Aires.

== History ==
In the late of the 19th century began the first Melkite Christians' immigration to Argentina. Two major waves of immigration took place between 1910 and 1930 and from 1949 to 1950. The majority of immigrants came from Lebanon and Syria and settled mostly in Rosario, Buenos Aires and Córdoba.

The Apostolic Exarchate was erected on 21 March 2002 with the papal bull Quandoquidem saeculorum of Pope John Paul II.

== Apostolic Exarchs ==
Apostolic Exarchs of Argentina

- Georges Nicholas Haddad, S.M.S.P. (20 April 2002 – 19 December 2005 resigned), Titular Bishop of Myra of the Greek-Melkites
- Jean-Abdo Arbach, B.C. (17 October 2006 – 23 June 2012), Titular Bishop of Hilta (17 October 2006 – 11 November 2006), Titular Bishop of Palmyra of the Greek-Melkites
- Ibrahim Salameh, S.M.S.P. (15 August 2013 – 14 January 2023), Titular Bishop of Palmyra of the Greek-Melkites
  - Apostolic Administrator Fr. Jean Abou Charouche, S.M.S.P. (14 January 2023 – 31 August 2026)
- Jean Abou Charouche, S.M.S.P. (since 31 August 2026), Titular Bishop of Myra of the Greek-Melkites

== Sources ==
- Annuario Pontificio, Libreria Editrice Vaticana, Città del Vaticano, 2003, ISBN 88-209-7422-3.
