= Melkite Greek Catholic Archeparchy of Baalbek =

Eastern Catholic archeparchy in Lebanon

Coordinates: 34.0069°N 36.2039°E

Archeparchy of Baalbek (Melkite Greek) Archeparchia Heliopolitana Graecorum Melkitarum

Location
- Country: Lebanon

Statistics
- Population: (as of 2010); 20,000
- Parishes: 7

Information
- Denomination: Melkite Greek Catholic Church
- Rite: Byzantine Rite
- Established: 18 November 1964 (61 years ago)
- Cathedral: Saint Barbara Cathedral

Current leadership
- Pope: Leo XIV
- Patriarch: Youssef Absi
- Archeparch: Makhoul Farha, OCD
- Bishops emeritus: Elias Rahal, SMSP

Melkite Greek Catholic Archeparchy of Baalbek (in Latin: Archeparchia Heliopolitana Graecorum Melkitarum) is a diocese of the Catholic Church immediately subject to the Patriarchate of Antioch of the Melkites. It is currently governed by Archbishop Elias Rahal.

== Territory and statistics ==
The archeparchy includes the northern part of the Bekaa Valley in Lebanon. Its Archeparchial seat is the city of Baalbek, where is the Saint Barbara Cathedral. In 2012 there were 20,000 baptized and its territory is divided into seven parishes.

== History ==
Baalbek is an ancient seat, already known in the fourth century by the name of Heliopolis of Phoenicia. It has had a presence of Catholic Bishops since 1701, when its bishop sent a profession of the Catholic faith to the Pope in Rome. This profession is still preserved in the archives of the Congregation for the Evangelization of Peoples. Baalbek was a suffragan of the Melkite Greek Catholic Archeparchy of Damascus until it acquired its autonomy in 1849.

The cathedral with the bishop's palace were built during the episcopate of Germanos Mouakkad; the church was consecrated by Eparch Agapitos Malouf in 1897. Bishop Germanos Mouakkad was the founder of the Society of the Missionaries of St. Paul.

On November 18, 1964 this eparchy was elevated to the rank of archeparchy.

In 1997 was celebrated the centenary of the dedication of the cathedral and the nineteenth centenary of the arrival of the first bishop of Baalbek / Heliopolis.

== Eparchs and Archeparchs ==
- Partenios (Haddad?) (1680 - 27 October 1722 deceased)
- Makarios (1724 -?)
- Basilios Bitar, BC (31 March 1754 - 1 January 1761 deceased)
- Philippe Qussayr, BC (1761 - July 24, 1777 deceased)
- Benoit Turkmani, BC (April 13, 1785 - November 22, 1808 deceased)
- Clément Moutran, BC (1810 - July 3, 1827 deceased)
- Etienne (Athanasius) Ubayd, BC (11 December 1827 - 1850 deceased)
- Elias (Meletios) Fendeh (14 November 1851 - 1 September 1869 deceased)
- Basilios Nasser (October 17, 1869 consecrated - September 26, 1885 deceased)
- Germanos Mouakkad, BS (March 16, 1887 consecrated - February 1894 resigned)
- Agapitos Malouf, BC (March 29, 1896 - February 12, 1922 deceased)
- Meletius Abou-Assaleh (5 June 1922 consecrated - June 27, 1937 deceased)
- Joseph Malouf, SMSP (October 5, 1937 - March 5, 1968 deceased)
- Elias Zoghby (September 9, 1968 - October 24, 1988 retired)
- Cyril Salim Bustros, SMSP (October 25, 1988 - June 22, 2004 appointed archeparch, personally, of Newton)
- Elias Rahal, SMSP (28 June 2004 – 16 July 2025 retired)
- Makhoul Farha, OCD (since 16 July 2025)
