= Gabriel Acacius Coussa =

Syrian Melkite Catholic archbishop

His Eminence Gabriel Acacius Coussa BA
- Secretary of the Congregation for the Oriental Churches
- Church: Melkite Greek Catholic Church
- Installed: 4 August 1961
- Term ended: 29 July 1962
- Predecessor: Amleto Giovanni Cicognani
- Successor: Gustavo Testa
- Other post: Cardinal-Priest of Sant'Atanasio
- Previous posts: Secretary of the Pontifical Commission for the Authentic Interpretation of the Code of Canon Law (1946–1961); Titular Archbishop of Hierapolis in Syria dei Greco-Melkiti (1961–1962)

Orders
- Ordination: 25 December 1920 by Isaias Papadopoulos
- Consecration: 16 April 1961 by Pope John XXIII

Personal details
- Born: Léon Gabriel Coussa; 3 August 1897 Aleppo, Aleppo Vilayet, Ottoman Empire
- Died: 29 July 1962 (aged 64) Rome, Italy
- Buried: Sant'Atanasio
- Denomination: Melkite Catholic
- Motto: Misericordiam Et Veritatem Diligit Dominus

Styles of Gabriel Acacius Coussa
- Reference style: His Eminence
- Spoken style: Your Eminence
- Informal style: Cardinal
- See: Sant'Atanasio

Gabriel Acacius Coussa, BA (3 August 1897 – 29 July 1962) was a Syrian prelate of the Melkite Greek Catholic Church who served as Secretary of the Congregation for the Eastern Churches from 1961 to 1962. He was the first Eastern Catholic to hold this position. He was a member of the Basilian Aleppian Order and was created a cardinal in 1962.

== Early life ==
Léon Gabriel Coussa was born in Aleppo, Syria, in 1897 to Rizcallah Coussa and his wife, Suzanne. He had two brothers, Georges and Nasri. His primary and part of his secondary education was at the Franciscan and Jesuit schools in Aleppo. Coussa joined the Order of St. Basil of the Melkites of Aleppo at the monastery of Saint-Georges Deir-esh-Chir in 1911. When admitted to the novitiate in 1912, he took the name Acacius. He was then sent to Rome to Collège Saint-Atanase.

Coussa made the simple profession on 21 November 1914 in the church of the Navicella. During World War I he fled to Switzerland because he was a Turkish citizen. He spent eighteen months in the Benedictine monastery of Einsiedeln, where he continued his theological studies. He returned to Rome on 9 November 1916 thanks to the intervention of the Holy See with the Italian government. He continued his studies at the Pontifical Urban University and resided at the Pontifical Greco-Roman College.

He made the solemn profession on 6 July 1918 at the church of the Navicella, and received the minor orders. On 11 July 1920 he was ordained a deacon. He then obtained a doctorate in both canon and civil law on 4 November 1922. Coussa was ordained a priest of the Basilian Alepian Order on 20 December 1920 in Rome by Isaias Papadopoulos, titular bishop of Grazianopoli, assessor of the Sacred Congregation of the Oriental Church.

== Priesthood and episcopal service ==
Coussa served as director of the Melkite Scholasticate in Beirut from 1921 to 1925. He was then chosen as assistant general of his order, a position he occupied from 19 December 1925 to 20 May 1934. While in that role he also acted as Superior of the monastery of Deir-esh-Chir in 1929.

In late 1929 he left for Rome, where he was the delegate of the Melkite hierarchy in the commission for the preparatory studies for the codification of the Oriental canon law. While in Rome he also assumed the position of professor of canon law at the Pontifical Roman Athenaeum from 1932 until 1936. Coussa began service as the assistant to the Pontifical Commission for the Preparation of the Oriental Canon Law on 21 March 1933; when the commission was charged with the redaction of the Code of Oriental Canon Law, he became its secretary, 16 July 1935.

From 1936 until 1953 he served as professor of the Latin Code of Canon Law, at the Pontifical Institute "Utriusque Iuris", Rome. Beginning in 1946 he served as dean of the faculty of canon law at the university. On 3 March 1946 Father Coussa was appointed Secretary of Interpretation of the Code of Canon Law for the Roman Curia. He was an acquaintance of Angelo Giuseppe Roncalli, who later was elected Pope John XXIII. Coussa was elected Assessor of the Sacred Commission for the Oriental Church on 15 January 1953.

On 26 February 1961 he was elected titular Archbishop of Hierapolis/Gerapoli for the Melkite Church. Coussa was consecrated bishop 16 April 1961 in the Sistine Chapel, by Pope John XXIII, assisted by Giovanni Mele, bishop of Lungro, for the Italo-Albanians of Continental Italy, by Giuseppe Perniciaro, titular bishop of Arbano, auxiliary and vicar general of the apostolic administrator of Piana degli Albanesi, by Archimandrite Théodore Minisci, higoumène of the Italo-Greek monastery of Grottaferrata, and by Archimandrite Ambroise Kassis, superior general of the Basilian Order of Aleppo. He was then named Pro-Secretary of the Congregation for the Eastern Churches on 4 August 1961.

On 13 August 1961, Coussa was appointed Pro-Secretary of the Congregation for the Eastern Churches. On 19 March 1962, he was appointed Cardinal-Priest of Saint Atanasio. He was the first Eastern Catholic to serve as the head of the Congregation.

His tenure, however, was short. Coussa died unexpectedly in Rome due to peritonitis caused by appendicitis on 29 July 1962, just as the Second Vatican Council was opening. His remains were transferred to the church of S. Atanasio, Rome, his cardinalitial church, in May 1963.

== See also ==
- Maximos IV Sayegh, Melkite Greek Catholic Patriarch
- Joseph Raya
