= The Shoes of the Fisherman =

The Shoes of the Fisherman may refer to:

- The Shoes of the Fisherman (novel), a 1963 novel by the writer Morris West
- The Shoes of the Fisherman (film), a 1968 film based on the novel
