= Basilian Aleppian Sisters =

Female branch of the Aleppian Order

The Basilian Aleppian Sisters is a religious order of the Melkite Greek Catholic Church and is considered to be the female branch of the Basilian Aleppian Order.

The order was founded in 1740.
