= Melkite Greek Catholic Church =

Eastern Catholic church

- كنيسة الروم الملكيين الكاثوليك (Arabic)
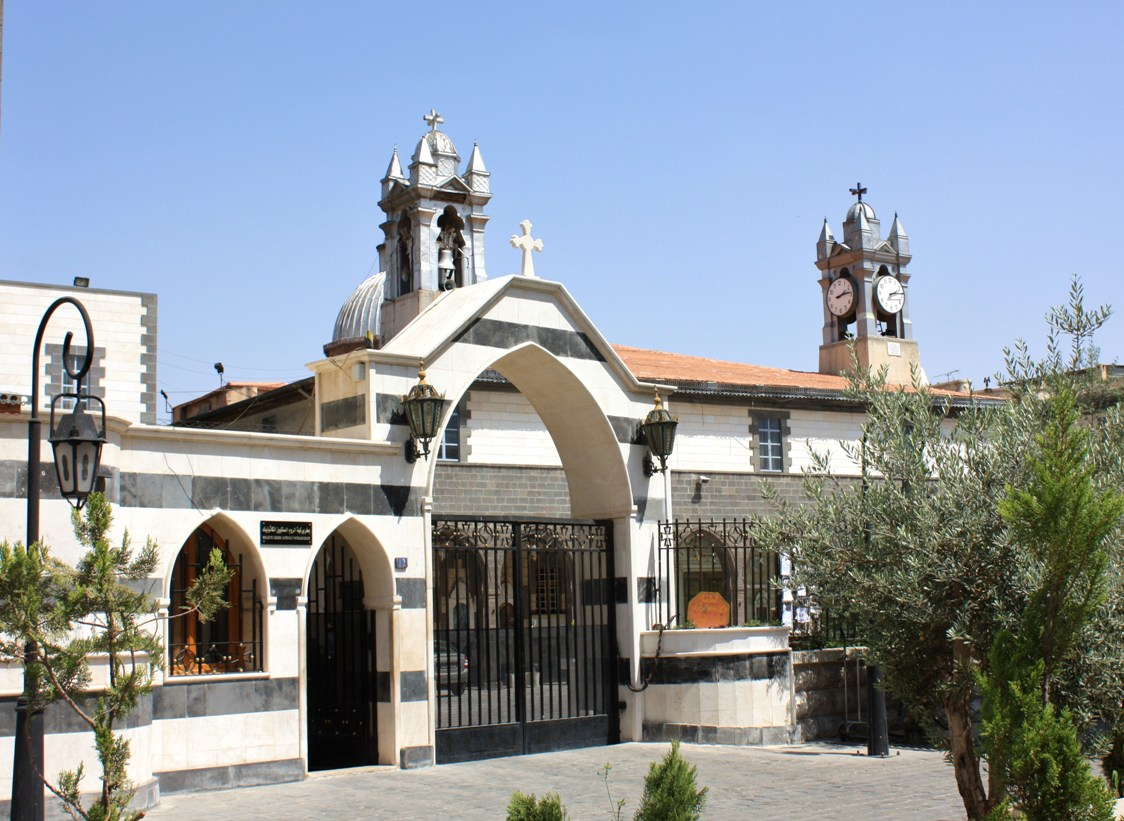
- Cathedral of Our Lady of the Dormition, Damascus, Syria
- Type: Particular church (sui luris)
- Classification: Christian
- Orientation: Eastern Catholic; Melkite
- Scripture: Bible
- Theology: Catholic theology
- Polity: Episcopal polity
- Pope: Leo XIV
- Patriarch: Youssef Absi
- First Patriarch: Cyril VI Tanas
- Region: Egypt, Palestine, Israel, Jordan, Lebanon, Sudan, Syria, Turkey, Iraq, Argentina, Australia, Belgium, Brazil, Canada, France, Mexico, New Zealand, United States, United Kingdom, Venezuela, Sweden
- Language: Arabic (diaspora: French, English, Portuguese, Spanish; liturgical: Greek)
- Liturgy: Byzantine Rite
- Headquarters: Cathedral of Our Lady of the Dormition, Damascus, Syria
- Founder: Saint Peter and Saint Paul (according to tradition)
- Origin: 1st century AD (traditionally)
- Branched from: Catholic Church
- Members: 1,568,239
- Other names: Melkite Church; Melkite Greek Church; Melkite Catholic Church; Catholic Rūm
- Official website: Official website

The Melkite Greek Catholic Church, (Note: Arabic: كنيسة الروم الملكيين الكاثوليك, Kanīsat ar-Rūm al-Malakiyyīn al-Kāṯūlīk; Greek: Μελχιτική Ελληνική Καθολική Εκκλησία, Melkhitikē Ellēnikē Katholikē Ekklēsia; Latin: Ecclesia Graeca Melchitarum Catholica) also known as the Melkite Byzantine Catholic Church, is an Eastern Catholic church in full communion with the Holy See as part of the worldwide Catholic Church. Its chief hierarch is Patriarch Youssef Absi, whose see is the Cathedral of Our Lady of the Dormition in Damascus, Syria.

The Melkite Church follows the Byzantine Rite and traces its origins to the early Christian community of the Patriarchate of Antioch in the 1st century AD, traditionally founded by the apostle Saint Peter. Today, the Melkite Church has approximately 1.6 million members worldwide.

The Melkite Greek Catholic Church and the Greek Orthodox Patriarchate of Antioch and All the East split from the original Chalcedonian Patriarchate of Antioch when the former entered into communion with Rome under Patriarch Cyril VI Tanas in 1724, a move opposed by most members of the Church of Antioch who formed the separate Greek Orthodox Patriarchate of Antioch. Thus, the two share the same liturgical, theological, and spiritual heritage, and both are centered in Syria (the Levant), with significant diaspora communities found worldwide due to historical emigration.

== Name ==
The term Melkite – from the Syriac word malkā for 'king' and the Arabic word malakī (Arabic: ملكي, meaning 'royal', and by extension, 'imperial') – was originally a pejorative term for Middle Eastern Christians who accepted the authority of the Council of Chalcedon (451 AD) and the Byzantine Emperor, a term applied to them by non-Chalcedonians. Of the Chalcedonian churches, Greek Catholics continued to use the term, while Eastern Orthodox did not.

The word Greek in this context signifies the Byzantine Rite heritage of the church, the liturgy used by all the Eastern Orthodox churches.

The term Catholic acknowledges communion with the Church of Rome and implies participation in the universal Christian church. According to Church tradition, the Melkite Church of Antioch is the "oldest continuous Christian community in the world".

In Arabic, the official language of the church, it is called ar-Rūm al-Kāṯūlīk (Arabic: الروم الكاثوليك, lit. '[Eastern] Roman Catholic'). The Arabic word Rūm means 'Romans', from the Greek word Romaioi by which the Greek-speaking Eastern Romans (called "Byzantines" in modern parlance) had continued to identify themselves even when the Western Roman empire had ceased to exist. The name literally means "Roman Catholic," confusingly for the modern English-speaker, but that refers not to the Latin Church but to the Greek-speaking Eastern Orthodox "Byzantine" Roman heritage, the centre of gravity of which was the city of "New Rome" (Latin: Nova Roma, Greek: Νέα Ρώμη), Constantinople.

== History ==
According to the Melkite Greek Catholic Church, its origins go back to the establishment of Christianity in the Near East. As Christianity began to spread, the disciples preached the Gospel throughout the region and were for the first time said to be called "Christians" in the city of Antioch (Acts 11:26), the historical See of the Melkite Catholic Patriarchate. Scholars attribute the actual writing of the gospels in Koine Greek to the Hellenized Christian population of Antioch, with authors such as St. Luke, the author of the Gospel of Luke and The Acts of the Apostles. By the 2nd century, Christianity was widespread in Antioch and throughout Syria. Growth of the church did not stop during periods of persecution, and by the end of the 4th century Christianity became the official state religion.

The Melkite Greek Catholic Church traces its origins to the Christian communities of the Levant and Egypt. The term Melkites was originally referred to those Christians in Egypt who were loyal to the Council of Chalcedon, and later referred to those in the Levant region as well. The church's leadership was vested in the three apostolic patriarchates of the ancient patriarchates: Alexandria, Antioch and Jerusalem.

=== Fallout of the Fourth Ecumenical Council ===
After the Fourth Ecumenical Council (the Council of Chalcedon) in AD 451, fifth-century Middle-Eastern Christian society became sharply divided between groups who did and did not accept the outcome of the council. The Chalcedonians, who accepted the decrees of the council, were mainly Greek-speaking city-dwellers; they were called Melkites ("imperials") by the anti-Chalcedonians, who were predominantly Armenian or Coptic-speaking provincials.

=== Fusion with Arabic language and culture ===
The Battle of Yarmuk (AD 636) took the Melkite homeland out of Byzantine control and placed it under the occupation of the Arab invaders. While the Greek language and culture remained important, especially for the Melkites of Jerusalem, Antiochene Melkite tradition merged with the Arabic language and culture. Although there was Arabic Christian poetry before the arrival of Islam, the newly extensive Antiochene blending with Arabic culture led to a degree of distancing from the Patriarch of Constantinople.

Despite the Arab invasion, the Melkites continued to exercise an important role in the Universal Church. The Melkites played a leading role in condemning the iconoclast controversy when it re-appeared in the early 9th century, and were among the first of the Eastern churches to respond to the introduction of the filioque clause in the West.

=== Communion with the Catholic Church ===
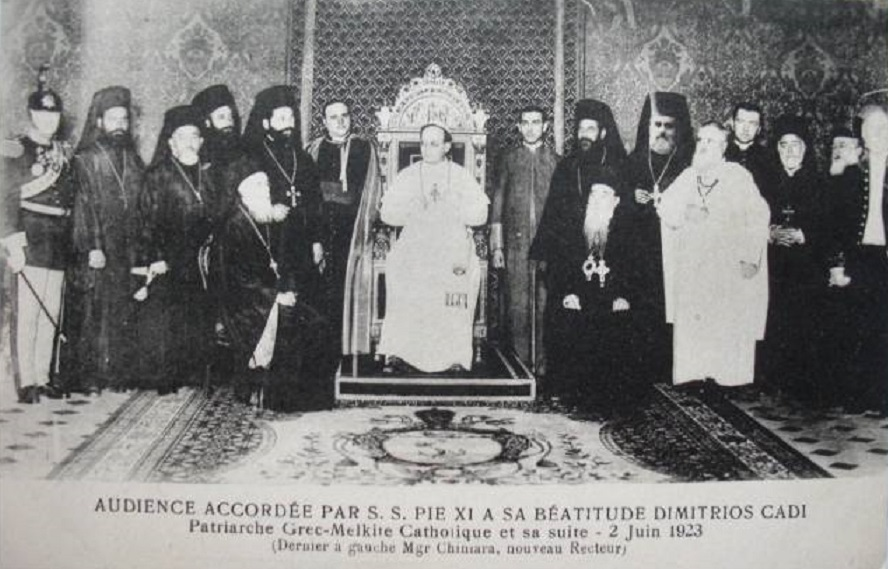
Pope Pius XI and Patriarch Demetrios I Qadi in 1923

In 1724, Cyril VI Tanas was elected the new patriarch of Antioch. As Cyril was considered to be pro-Western, the Patriarch Jeremias III of Constantinople feared that his own authority would be compromised by the former's ascent; Jeremias therefore declared Cyril's election to be invalid, excommunicated him, and ordained the Greek hierodeacon Sylvester of Antioch as a priest and bishop, so that the latter might take Cyril's place.

Sylvester, considered "unyielding and uncompromising" by both supporters and opponents, exacerbated divisions within the Church with his heavy-handed rule, and many Melkites reacted by instead acknowledging Cyril's claim to the patriarchal throne. Sylvester began a five-year campaign of persecution enforced by Ottoman Turkish troops against Cyril and the Melkite faithful who supported him, forcing him to find refuge in Lebanon.

Five years after the election of Cyril VI, in 1729, Pope Benedict XIII recognized him as patriarch of Antioch, and recognized his followers as being in full communion with the Catholic Church and the pope of Rome. From this time onward, the Melkite Greek Catholic Church has existed separately from and in parallel with the Greek Orthodox Church of Antioch in Western Asia; the latter is no longer referred to as Melkite.

Melkite Bishop Nicholas Samra notes that the feast of Corpus Christi, which he calls "a distinct[ly] Latin feast", was adopted by the Melkite Church soon after its admission to full communion.

The Melkite Greek Catholic Church has played an important role in the leadership of Arab Christianity; it has always been led by Arabic-speaking Christians, whereas its Orthodox counterpart had Greek patriarchs until 1899. Indeed, at the very beginning of its separate existence, around 1725, one lay leader and theologian—Abdallah Zakher of Aleppo (1684–1748)—set up the very first printing press in the Arab world. In 1835, Maximos III Mazloum, Melkite Greek Catholic Patriarch of Antioch, was recognized by the Ottoman Empire as the leader of a millet (a distinctive religious community within the Empire). Pope Gregory XVI gave Maximos III Mazloum the triple patriarchate of Antioch, Alexandria, and Jerusalem, a title which is still held by the leader of the Melkite Greek Catholic Church.

=== Expansion and participation at the First Vatican Council ===
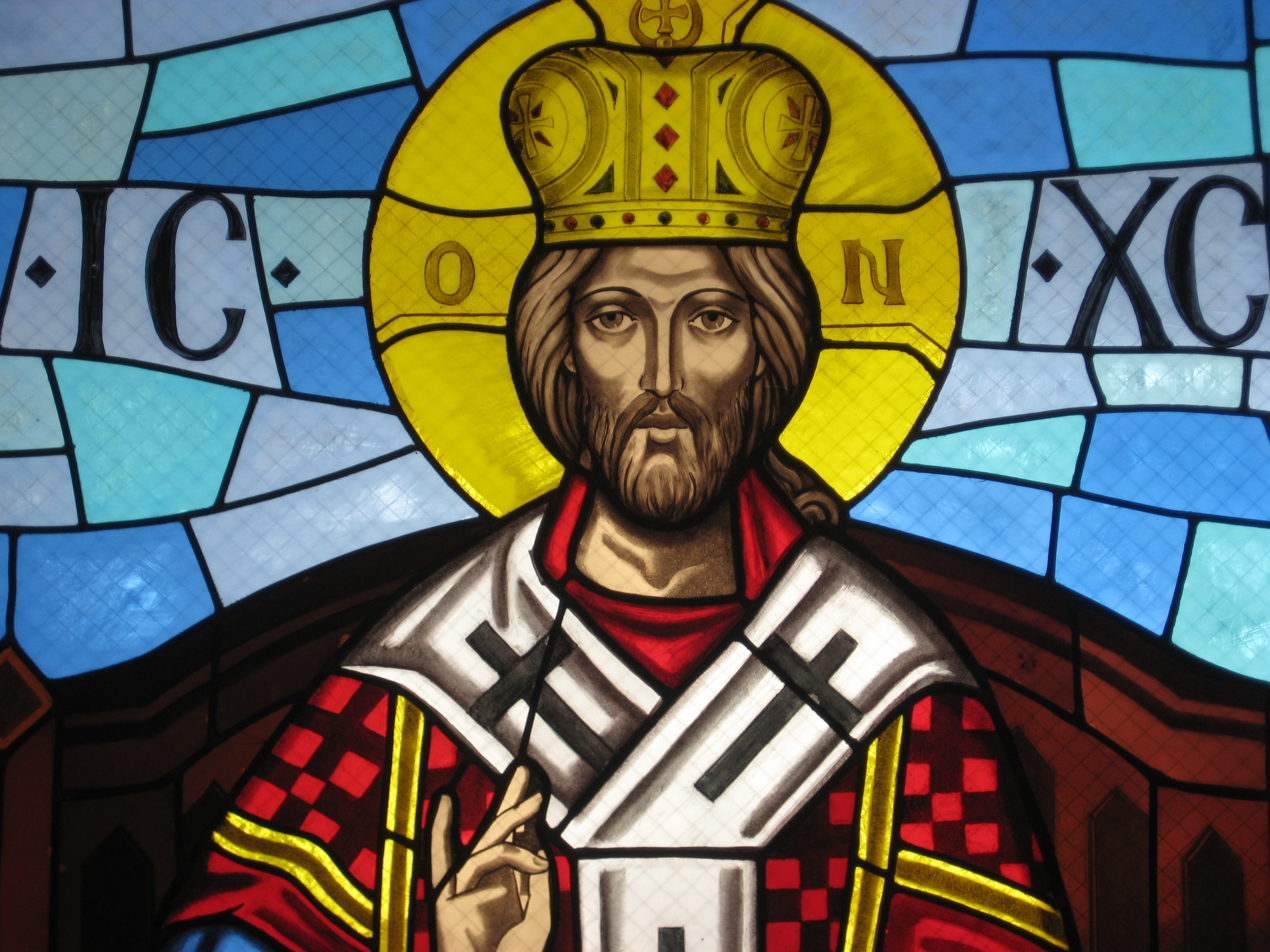
Stained glass window at the Annunciation Melkite Catholic Cathedral in Roslindale, Massachusetts depicting Christ enthroned in regalia of a Byzantine emperor

In 1806, Germanos Adam, the Archbishop of Aleppo, convened the Synod of Qarqafe which adapted and ratified propositions of the 1786 Synod of Pistoia. It was formally accepted by the Melkite church, but was formally condemned in 1835 by Pope Gregory XVI in the bull Melchitarum Catholicorum Synodus.

In 1847, Pope Pius IX (1846–1878) reinstituted the Latin Patriarchate of Jerusalem in the person of the 34-year-old Giuseppe Valerga (1813–1872), whom the indigenous hierarchy nicknamed "The Butcher" because of his fierce opposition to the Eastern Orthodox churches of the Holy Land. When he arrived in Jerusalem in 1847, there were 4,200 Latin Catholics and when he died in 1872, the number had doubled.

In 1856, Clement Bahouth became patriarch. Under pressure from the Roman Curia to adopt Latin Church practices, he introduced the Gregorian calendar used by the Latin and Maronite Churches in 1857. The act caused serious problems within the Melkite community, resulting in a short-lived schism. At one point, the Metropolitan of Beirut, Agapios Riashi, refused to comply and supported two priests, Gabriel Gibara and John Massamiri, who openly revolted and formed dissident groups in Damascus and Egypt. Three bishops – Theodosius Qayoumgi, Basil Chahiat, and Meletius Findi – representing the archeparchies of Sidon, Zahlé, and Baalbek, respectively, sided with the dissidents. In the face of the growing conflict, Clement attempted to abdicate his position as patriarch, but the pope, Pius IX, rejected his resignation. Pius IX summoned Riashi, but was rebuffed, instead sending a letter with the other three bishops. The Vatican condemned the letter and called on Bahouth to claim the support of the Sublime Porte. Riashi continued to resist and was, as a result, excluded from the First Vatican Council. The other three bishops eventually resubmitted to the patriarch. Although Massamiri – who had been consecrated as the Orthodox Bishop of Palmyra – was brought back by the next patriarch, Gregory II Youssef, Gibara died in dissidence. In 1864, Bahouth again requested to be allowed to resign, hoping to retire to monastic life. This time, the pope assented and his resignation was officially accepted on 24 September 1864. On 29 September, the Bishop of Acre, Gregory II Youssef, was chosen as patriarch.

Officially confirmed in 1865, Gregory initially focused on improving church institutions. During his time as patriarch, Gregory founded both the Patriarchal College in Beirut in 1865 and the Patriarchal College in Damascus in 1875 and he re-opened the Melkite seminary of Ain Traz in 1866. He also promoted the establishment of Saint Ann's Seminary, Jerusalem, in 1882 by the White Fathers for the training of the Melkite clergy.

Following the Ottoman Reform Edict of 1856, decreed by Sultan Abdülmecid I, the situation of Christians in the Near East improved. This allowed Gregory to successfully encourage greater participation by the Melkite laity in both church administration as well as public affairs. Gregory also took an interest in ministering to the growing number of Melkites who had emigrated to the Americas. In 1889 he dispatched Father Ibrahim Beshawate of the Basilian Salvatorian Order in Saida, Lebanon, to New York in order to minister to the growing Syrian community there. According to historian Philip Hitte, Beshawate was the first permanent priest in the United States from the Near East from among the Melkite, Maronite, and Antiochian Orthodox churches.

Gregory was also a prominent proponent of Eastern ecclesiology at the First Vatican Council, giving a now oft-lauded speech during its fifty-fourth session regarding the third chapter of Pastor aeternus. In the two discourses he gave at the Council on 19 May and 14 June 1870, he insisted on the importance of conforming to the decisions of the Council of Florence, of not creating innovations such as papal infallibility, but accepting what had been decided by common agreement between the Greeks and the Latins at the Council of Florence, especially with regard to the issue of papal primacy. He was keenly aware of the disastrous impact that the dogmatic definition of papal infallibility would have on relations with the Eastern Orthodox Church and emerged as a prominent opponent of the dogma at the Council. He also defended the rights and privileges of the patriarchs according to the canons promulgated by earlier ecumenical councils. Speaking at the Council on 19 May 1870, Patriarch Gregory asserted:

The Eastern Church attributes to the pope the most complete and highest power, however in a manner where the fullness and primacy are in harmony with the rights of the patriarchal sees. This is why, in virtue of an ancient right founded on customs, the Roman Pontiffs did not, except in very significant cases, exercise over these sees the ordinary and immediate jurisdiction that we are asked now to define without any exception. This definition would completely destroy the constitution of the entire Greek church. That is why my conscience as a pastor refuses to accept this constitution.

Patriarch Gregory refused to sign the Council's dogmatic declaration on papal infallibility. He and the seven other Melkite bishops present voted non placet at the general congregation and left Rome prior to the adoption of the dogmatic constitution Pastor aeternus on papal infallibility. Other members of the anti-infallibilist minority, both from the Latin church and from other Eastern Catholic churches, also left the city.

After the First Vatican Council concluded, an emissary of the Roman Curia was dispatched to secure the signatures of the patriarch and the Melkite delegation. Patriarch Gregory and the Melkite bishops subscribed to it, but with the qualifying clause as used at the Council of Florence attached: "except the rights and privileges of Eastern patriarchs". He earned the enmity of Pius IX for this. According to one account, during his next visit to the pontiff, Gregory was cast to the floor at Pius' feet by the papal guard while the pope placed his foot on the patriarch's head. This story, however, has been cast into doubt by more recent studies of the First Vatican Council. John R. Quinn cites Joseph Hajjar in his book Revered and Reviled: A Re-Examination of Vatican Council 1,: "We have been unable to find any document to provide historical verification for such treatment by the Pope." Orthodox historian A. Edward Siecienski reports that the historicity of this story "is now deeply suspect." Despite this, Patriarch Gregory and the Melkite Church remained committed to their union with the Church of Rome. Relationships with the Vatican improved following the death of Pius IX and the subsequent election of Leo XIII as pontiff. Leo's encyclical Orientalium dignitas addressed some of the Eastern Catholic Churches' concerns on latinization and the centralizing tendencies of Rome. Leo also confirmed that the limitations placed on the Armenian Catholic patriarch by Pius IX's 1867 letter Reversurus would not apply to the Melkite Church; further, Leo formally recognized an expansion of Patriarch Gregory's jurisdiction to include all Melkites throughout the Ottoman Empire.

Nowadays, the Melkite church fully affirms and accepts papal infallibility.

=== Vatican II conflicts over Latin and Melkite traditions ===
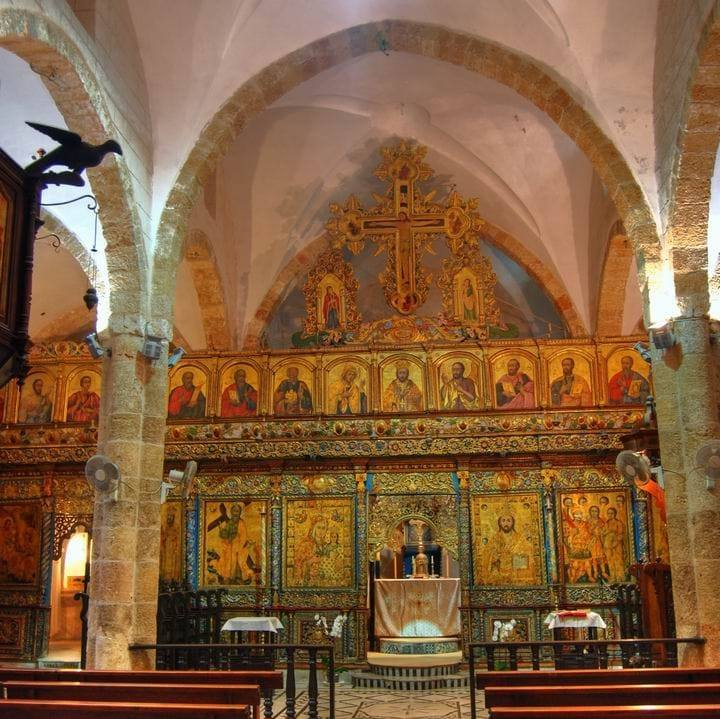
Church of Saint Andrew, Acre.

Patriarch Maximos IV Sayegh took part in the Second Vatican Council where he argued against Latinization and championed the Eastern tradition of Christianity, arguing that Latin Church Catholics should be more receptive to the authentic traditions of Eastern Christianity. He won a great deal of respect from Orthodox observers at the council as well as the approbation of the Ecumenical Patriarch of Constantinople, Athenagoras I, who noted: "You have represented the East at the Council and there you have caused our voice to be heard." Following the Second Vatican Council the Melkites moved to restoring traditional worship. This involved both the restoration of Melkite practices such as administering the Eucharist to infants following post-baptismal chrismation as well as removal of Latinized elements such as communion rails and confessionals. In the pre-conciliar days, the leaders of this trend were members of "The Cairo School", a group of young priests centered on the Patriarchal College in Cairo. This group included Fathers George Selim Hakim, Joseph Tawil, Elias Zoghby, and former Jesuit Oreste Kerame; they later became bishops and participated in the Second Vatican Council, and saw their efforts vindicated; the work done by the School laid the foundation for Maximos' work at the Second Vatican Council.

These reforms led to protests by some Melkite churches that the de-latinisation had gone too far. During the patriarchate of Maximos IV Sayegh, some Melkites in the United States objected to the use of the vernacular in the celebration of the Divine Liturgy, a movement that was spearheaded by the future archbishop of Nazareth, Father Joseph Raya of Birmingham, Alabama. The issue garnered national news coverage after Bishop Fulton Sheen celebrated a Pontifical Divine Liturgy in English at the Melkite National convention in Birmingham in 1960, parts of which were televised on the national news.

=== Resolution ===
In 1960, the issue was resolved by Pope John XXIII at the request of Patriarch Maximos IV in favour of the use of vernacular languages in the celebration of the Divine Liturgy. Pope John also consecrated a Melkite priest, Father Gabriel Acacius Coussa, as a bishop, using the Byzantine Rite and the papal tiara as a crown. Bishop Coussa was almost immediately elevated to the cardinalate, but died two years later. His cause for canonization was introduced by his religious order, the Basilian Alepian Order.

Further protests against the de-latinisation of the church occurred during the patriarchate of Maximos V Hakim (1967–2000) when some church officials who supported Latin traditions protested against allowing the ordination of married men as priests. Today the church has a role as a voice of the East within the western church, a bridge between faiths and peoples.

=== Growth of the Melkite diaspora ===
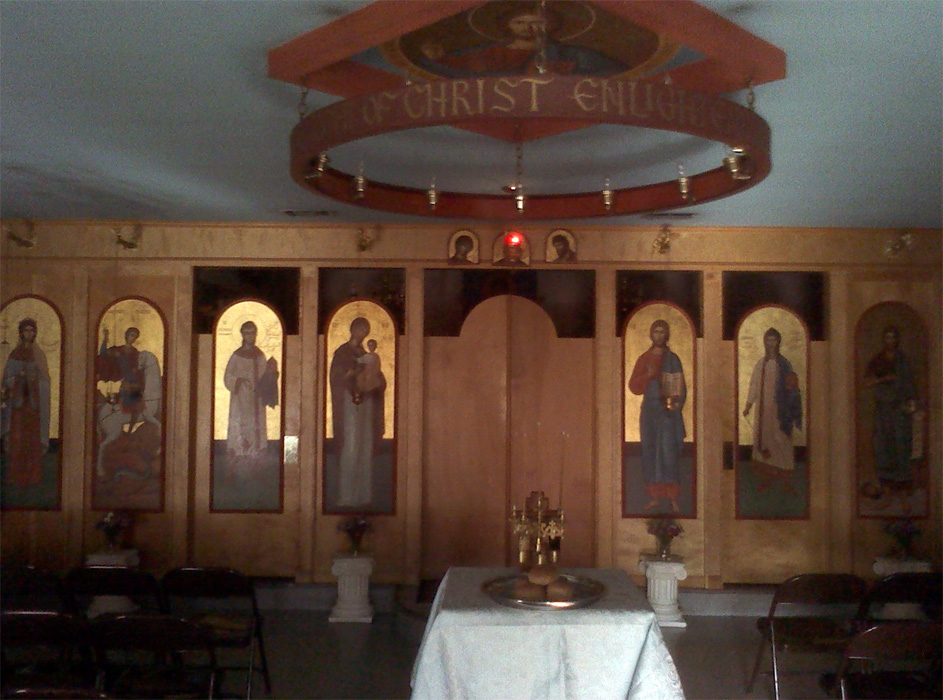
Iconostasis at Saint George Greek-Melkite Church in Sacramento, California

Due to heavy emigration from the Eastern Mediterranean, which began with the Damascus massacres of 1860 in which most of the Christian communities were attacked, the Melkite Greek Catholic Church today is found throughout the world and no longer made up exclusively of faithful of Eastern Mediterranean origin. The Patriarchate of Maximos V saw many advances in the worldwide presence of the Melkite Church, called "the Diaspora": Eparchies (the Eastern equivalent of a diocese) were established in the United States, Canada, Brazil, Australia, Argentina, and Mexico in response to the continued emptying of the Eastern Mediterranean of her native Christian peoples. In 1950, the richest Melkite community in the world was in Egypt. After the establishment of the United Arab Republic by Gamal Abdul Nasser in 1958, a combination of factors led several thousand Melkites from Syria – particularly Aleppo and Damascus – and Egypt to emigrate to Lebanon.

In 1967, a native Egyptian of Syrian-Aleppin descent, George Selim Hakim, was elected the successor of Maximos IV, and took the name Maximos V. He was to reign until he retired at the age of 92 in the Jubilee Year of 2000. He died on the feast of Saints Peter and Paul, June 29, 2001. He was succeeded by Archbishop Lutfi Laham, who took the name Gregory III.

== Demographics ==
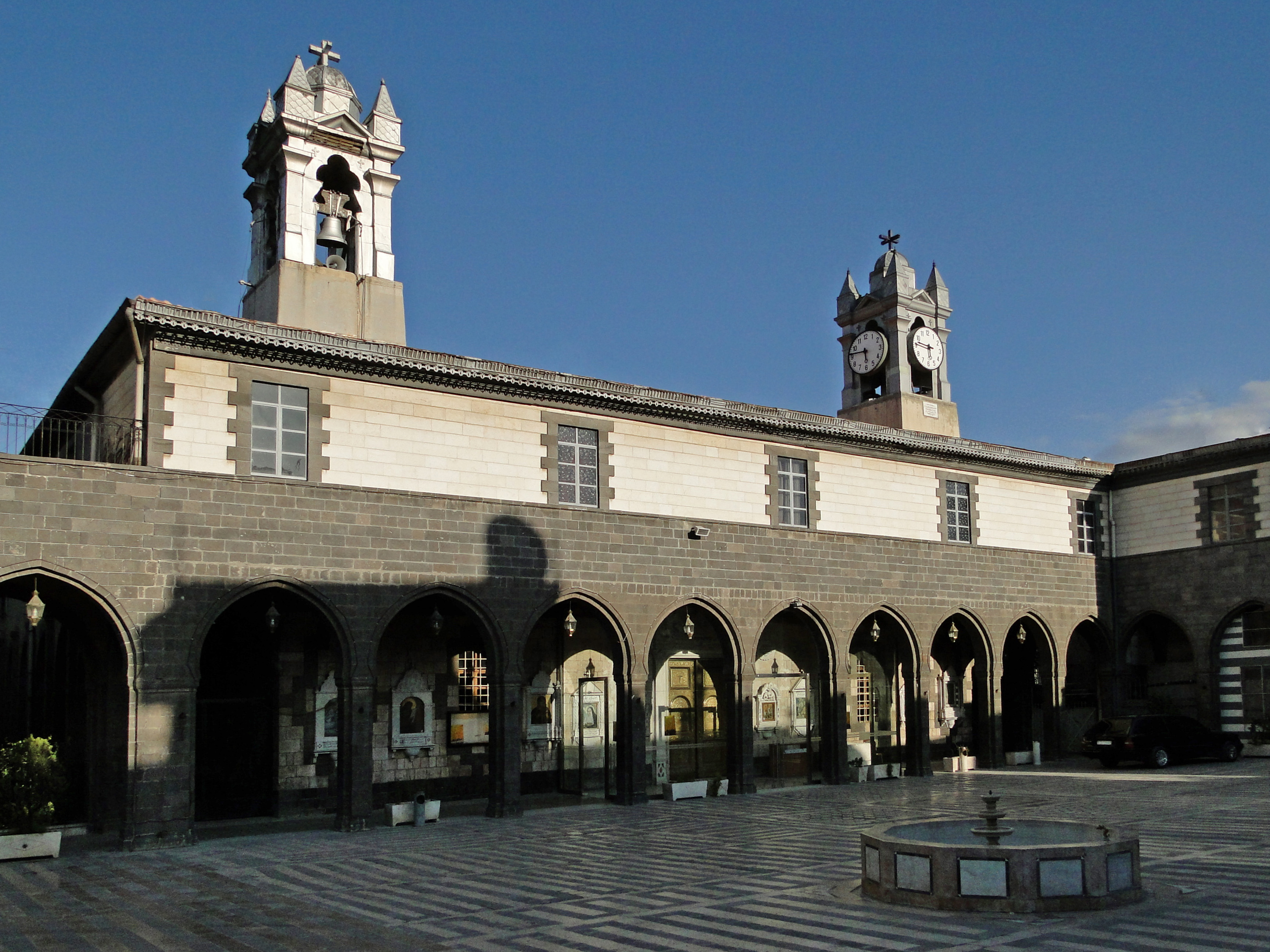
Melkite Greek Catholic Patriarchal Cathedral in Damascus

Today, the Melkite Church has around 1.6 million members worldwide. Most Melkite Catholics are of Levantine descent, with the majority identifying as Arab. Over the first millennium, Arabic gradually replaced Syriac and Greek, while Arab culture and identity have increasingly shaped the church’s life and traditions. Today, Arabic has become the primary language of the Melkite Church, gradually replacing Byzantine Greek as the dominant liturgical language. The Melkite Greek Catholic Church is the largest Catholic community in Syria and Israel, and the second largest in Lebanon. As of 2014, it was also the largest Christian denomination in Israel, with approximately 60% of Israeli Christians belonging to the Melkite Greek Catholic Church.

According to 2008 figures from the Holy See, Lebanon now hosts the largest Melkite community in the Middle East, numbering approximately 425,000, followed by Syria with about 234,000. In addition, there are over 80,000 Melkite Greek Catholics in Israel and Palestine, and approximately 27,600 in Jordan.

Before 1948, a significant number of Melkites resided in Israel and the Palestinian territories. However, various waves of conflict in the region prompted many to relocate to other parts of the Middle East or emigrate abroad. The Lebanese civil war also dealt a severe blow to Melkite communities, resulting in the loss of villages and institutions, and the Syrian Civil War further displaced Melkite communities, forcing many to leave their ancestral homes. Today, the global Melkite population living outside the Middle East surpasses that within the region. Historically, Egypt, Damascus, and Aleppo were home to vibrant, affluent, and highly educated Melkite communities.

As of 2017, due to Christian emigration from the Middle East, São Paulo has become home to the largest Melkite community in the diaspora, estimated at around 433,000 members, followed by Argentina, with approximately 302,800. Significant Melkite populations are also found in Australia (52,000), Canada (35,000), Venezuela (25,400), the United States (24,000), Mexico (4,700), and other countries.

== Organization ==
The Melkite Greek Catholic Church is in full communion with the Holy See (the Pope of Rome and his Roman Congregation for the Eastern Churches), and it thus fully affirms and accept the Pope's authority, including Papal infallibility. The patriarch is represented by his Procurator at Rome, but fully follows the traditions and customs of Byzantine Christianity. The traditional languages of worship are Arabic and Greek, but today, services are held in a variety of languages, depending on the country where the church is located.

The Melkite Synod of Bishops, composed of all of the church's bishops, meets each year to consider administrative, theological and church-wide issues. The vast majority of the Melkite diocesan priests in the Middle East are married.

=== Patriarchate ===
The current patriarch is Youssef Absi who was elected on 21 June 2017. The patriarchate is based in the Syrian capital Damascus, but it formally remains one of the Eastern Catholic patriarchs claiming the apostolic succession to the ancient see of Antioch, and has been permanently granted the styles of titular patriarch of Alexandria and Jerusalem, two other patriarchates with multiple Catholic succession.

The patriarchate is administered by a permanent synod, which includes the patriarch and four bishops, the ordinary tribunal of the patriarch for legal affairs, the patriarchal economos who serves as financial administrator, and a chancery.

=== Current dioceses and similar jurisdictions ===
In the Arab World and Africa, the church has dioceses in:

- Egypt, Sudan and South Sudan, where the Patriarch of Antioch has the style of Titular Patriarch of Alexandria:
  - Melkite Catholic Territory Dependent on the Patriarch of Egypt, Sudan and South Sudan (administered by a Patriarchal Vicar or Protosyncellus, titular Archeparchy of Alexandria)

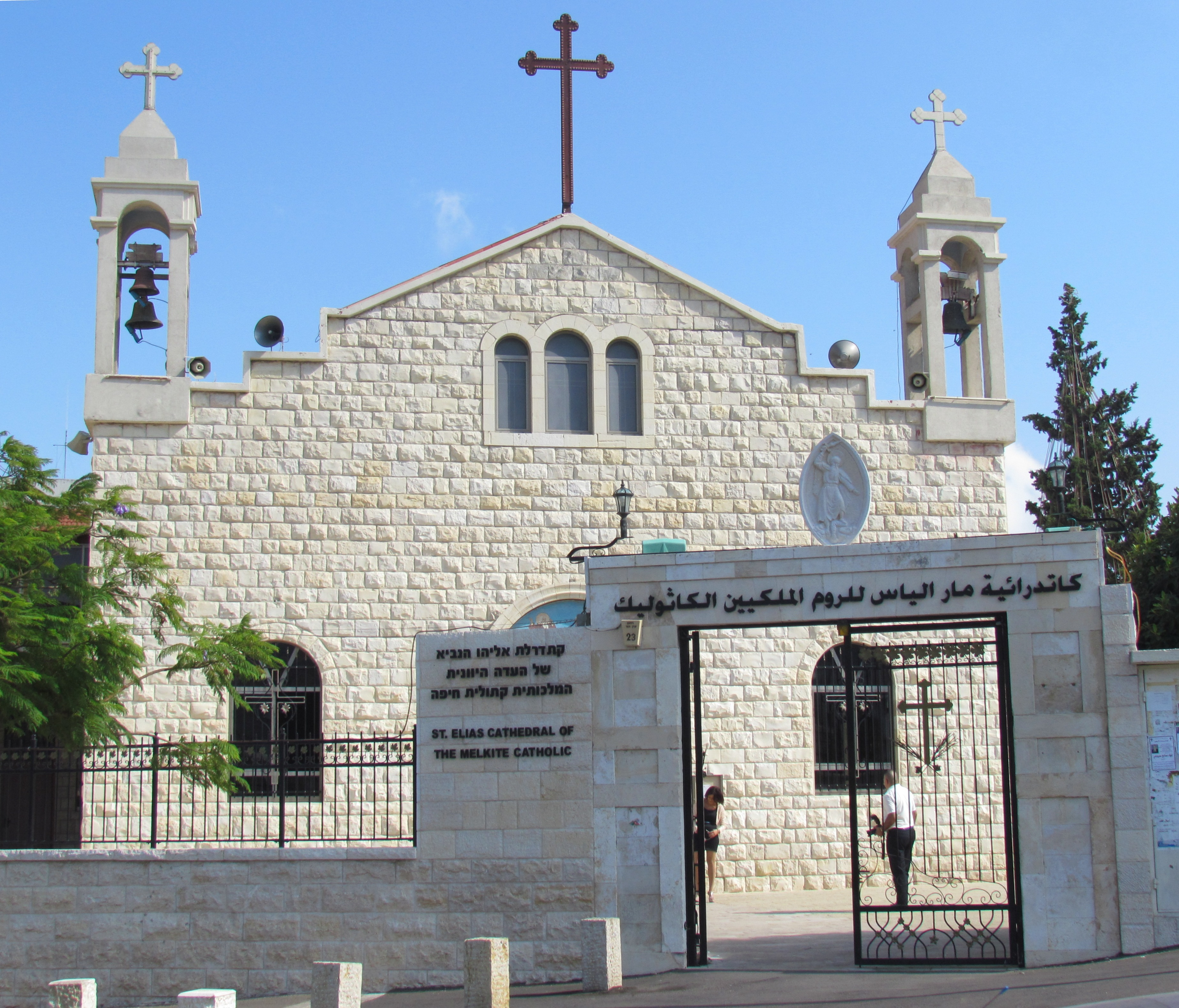
St. Elijah Cathedral, Haifa: the cathedral of the Melkite Greek Catholic Archeparchy of Akka.

- The Holy Land, where the Patriarch of Antioch has the style of Titular Patriarch of Jerusalem:
  - Israel: Melkite Greek Catholic Archeparchy of Akka (including Haifa, Nazareth and all Galilee)
  - Palestinian territories: Melkite Catholic Territory Dependent on the Patriarch of Jerusalem (administered by a Patriarchal Vicar or Protosyncellus, titular Archeparchy of Jerusalem).
  - Transjordan: Melkite Greek Catholic Archeparchy of Petra and Philadelphia in Amman and all Transjordan
- Iraq:
  - Melkite Greek Catholic Patriarchal Exarchate of Iraq
- Arabian Peninsula:
  - Melkite Greek Catholic Patriarchal Exarchate of Kuwait
- Lebanon:
  - Melkite Greek Catholic Archeparchy of Baalbek
  - Melkite Greek Catholic Archeparchy of Baniyas and Marjeyoun (suffragan of Tyre)
  - Melkite Greek Catholic Archeparchy of Beirut and Byblos (nominally Metropolitan)
  - Melkite Greek Catholic Archeparchy of Sidon and Deir el-Kamar (suffragan of Tyre)
  - Melkite Greek Catholic Archeparchy of Tripoli (suffragan of Tyre)
  - Melkite Greek Catholic Archeparchy of Tyre (Metropolitan see with three Lebanese archiepiscopal suffragans)
  - Melkite Greek Catholic Archeparchy of Zahle and Forzol and all the Bekaa (suffragan of Damascus)

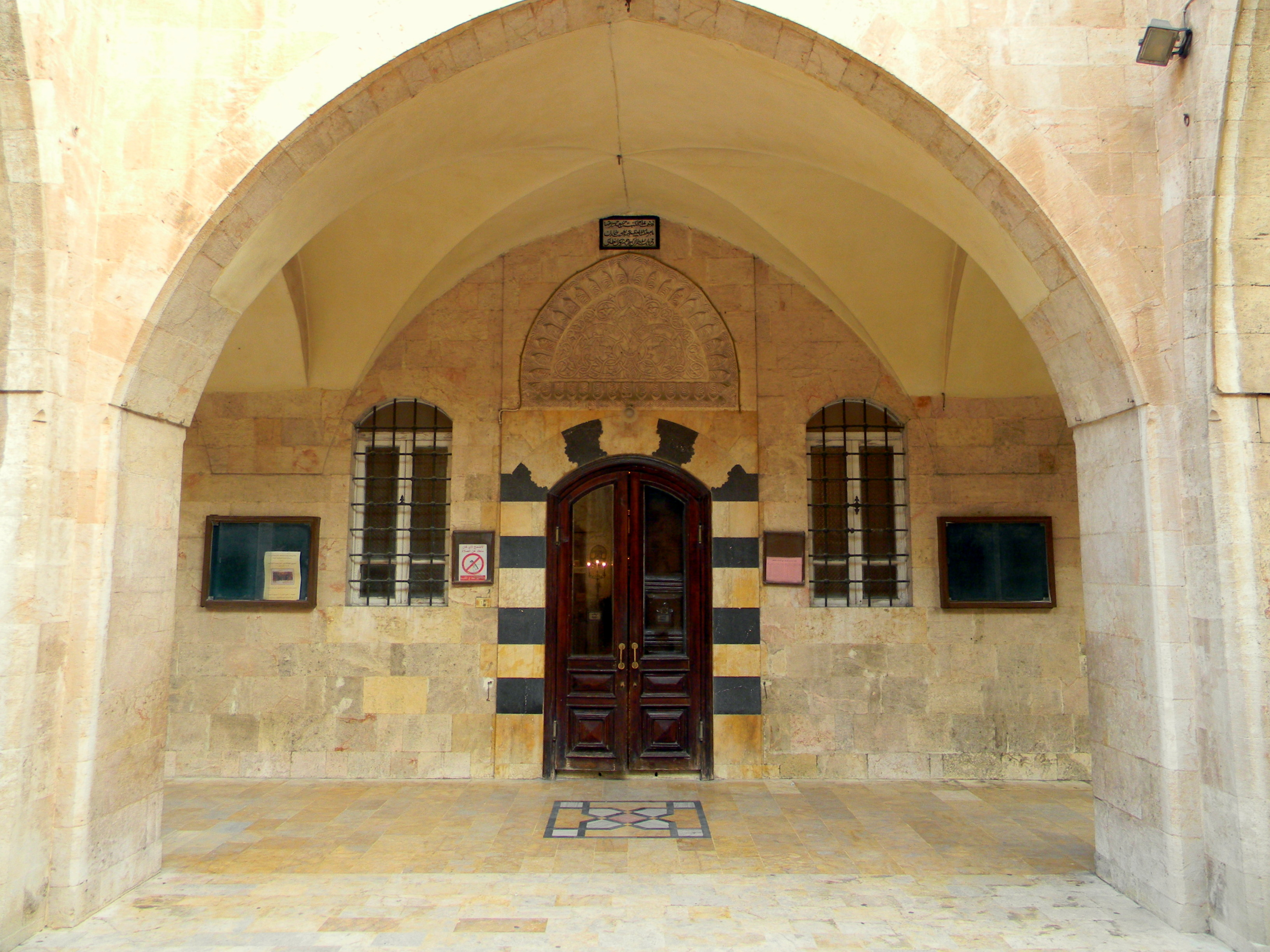
Virgin Mary Cathedral of Aleppo: the cathedral of the Melkite Greek Catholic Archeparchy of Aleppo.

- Syria:
  - Melkite Greek Catholic Archeparchy of Damascus, Patriarchal See of Antioch
  - Melkite Greek Catholic Archeparchy of Aleppo (nominally Metropolitan)
  - Melkite Greek Catholic Archeparchy of Bosra and Hauran (Archeparchy of Khabab) (nominally metropolitan)
  - Melkite Greek Catholic Archeparchy of Homs (united with titular sees Hama and Yabroud) (nominally metropolitan)
  - Melkite Greek Catholic Archeparchy of Latakia (including the Valley of the Christians)
- Turkey (Eurasia):
  - Melkite Greek Catholic Patriarchal Exarchate of Istanbul (Note: Pope Leo XIII, through the 1894 encyclical Orientalium Dignitas (nº XIII), expanded the jurisdiction of the Melkite patriarch to include the whole of the Turkish Empire. (Latin: Patriarchae Graeco Melchitae iurisdictionem tribuimus in eos quoque fideles eiusdem ritus qui intra fines Turcici Imperii versantur.) (English: We grant the jurisdiction of the Greek Melchite Patriarch over those faithful of the same rite who are within the borders of the Turkish Empire.))

Throughout the rest of the world, the Melkite Greek Catholic Church has dioceses and exarchates for its diaspora in:

- Australia and New Zealand (Oceania):
  - Melkite Greek Catholic Eparchy of Saint Michael Archangel in Sydney

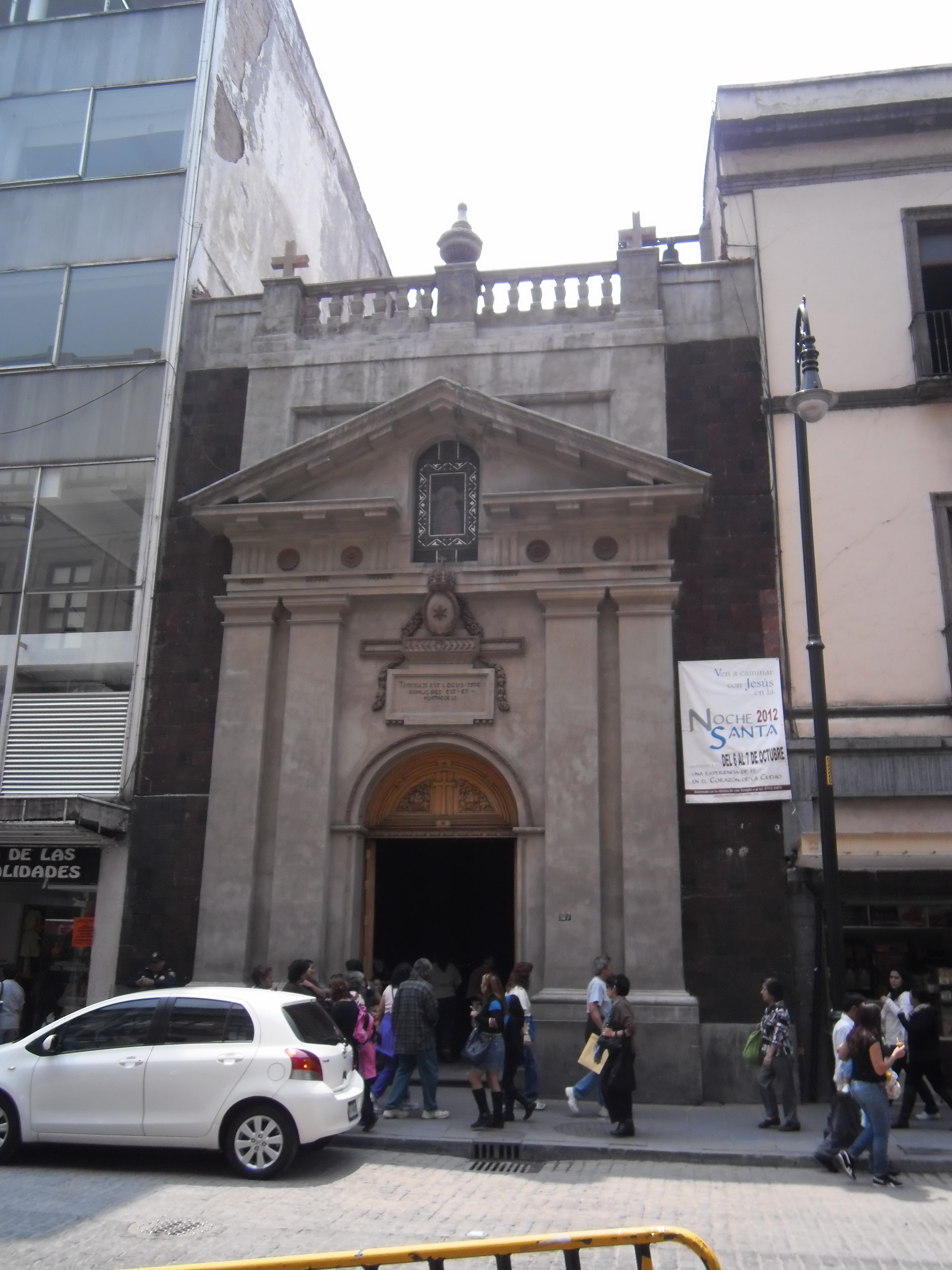
Porta Coeli Church (now the Melkite Greek Catholic Cathedral of Mexico City)

- North America:
  - Melkite Greek Catholic Eparchy of Saint-Sauveur in Montréal (Canada)
  - Melkite Greek Catholic Eparchy of Nuestra Señora del Paraíso in Mexico City (Mexico)
  - Melkite Greek Catholic Eparchy of Newton (United States of America)
- South America:
  - Melkite Greek Catholic Apostolic Exarchate of Argentina
  - Melkite Greek Catholic Eparchy of Nossa Senhora do Paraíso em São Paulo (Brazil) (suffragan of the Latin Metropolitan of São Paulo)
  - Melkite Greek Catholic Apostolic Exarchate of Venezuela, Caracas

In Western Europe, the Melkite Greek Catholic Church has the following parishes and communities for its diaspora:

- While in some countries the Melkite diaspora is served pastorally by the Eastern Ordinariates, one of the Ordinaries is appointed Apostolic visitor for the countries without proper ordinariate.
  - Melkite Greek Catholic Parish of Saint Julien the Poor (Paris, France) (subject to the Ordinariate for Eastern Catholics in France)
  - Melkite Greek Catholic Parish of Saint Nicolas of Myra (Marseille, France) (subject to the Ordinariate for Eastern Catholics in France)
  - Melkite Greek Catholic Parish of St. John Chrysostom (Brussels, Belgium) (subject to the Latin Archdiocese of Mechelen–Brussels)
  - Melkite Greek Catholic Parish of St. John Chrysostom (London, United Kingdom) (subject to the Latin Diocese of Westminster)
  - Melkite Greek Catholic Missions in Stockholm and Sollentuna (Sweden) (subject to the Latin Diocese of Stockholm)
  - Melkite Greek Catholic Community of the Church of Our Lady of Damascus (La Valeta, Malta) (subject to the Latin Archdiocese of Malta)
  - Melkite Greek Catholic Community of the Church of St. James (Vienna, Austria) (subject to the Ordinariate for Catholics of Byzantine Rite in Austria)
  - Melkite Greek Catholic Community of the Basilica of Saint Mary in Cosmedin (Rome, Italy) (under the care of the Patriarch's Procurator in Rome)
  - Melkite Greek Catholic Community of the Church of Saint Basil at the Gardens of Sallust (Rome, Italy) (under the care of the Basilian Salvatorian Order)

=== Titular sees ===
- Four Metropolitan Titular archbishoprics: Apamea in Syria, Cesarea in Palæstina, Edessa in Osrhoëne, Pelusium
- Six other Titular archbishoprics: Adana, Cesarea in Cappadocia, Damiata, Hama (united with current Melkite Greek Catholic Archeparchy of Homs), Hierapolis in Syria, Myra, Tarsus
- Two Episcopal Titular bishoprics: Jabrud (united with current Melkite Greek Catholic Archeparchy of Homs), Laodicea in Syria, Palmyra

=== Current hierarchy of the Melkite Greek Catholic Church ===
The present Melkite Greek Catholic episcopate (37 hierarchs as per 31 October 2026) is as follows:

Patriarch and primate:

- Youssef Absi, SMSP – Patriarch of Antioch and of All the East, of Alexandria and of Jerusalem (since 2017)

Eparchial Hierarchs and Exarchs:

Archbishops:

- Georges Nicholas Haddad, SMSP – Archbishop of Baniyas (since 2006)
- Elie Bechara Haddad, BS – Archbishop of Sidon (since 2007)
- Jean-Abdo Arbach, BS – Archbishop of Homs (since 2012)
- Eduard Daher, BC – Archbishop of Petra and Philadelphia (since 2026)
- Georges Bacouni – Archbishop of Beirut and Jbail (since 2018)
- Nicolas Antiba, BA – Archbishop, Patriarchal Vicar of Damas (since 2018)
- Yasser Ayyash – Archbishop, Protosyncellus of Jerusalem (since 2018)
- Elias El-Debei – Archbishop of Bosra and Hauran (since 2018)
- Youssef Matta – Archbishop of Akka (since 2019)
- Ibrahim Ibrahim, BS – Archbishop of Zehleh and Fuzol (since 2021)
- Georges Khawam, SMSP – Archbishop of Latakia (since 2021)
- Georges Masri – Archbishop of Aleppo (since 2021)
- Georges Iskandar, BS – Archbishop of Tyre (since 2022)
- Makhoul Farha, OCD – Archbishop of Baalbek (since 2025)

Bishops:

- Robert Rabbat – Bishop of Saint Michael’s of Sydney (since 2011)
- Georges Khoury – Bishop of Nossa Senhora do Paraíso em São Paulo (since 2019)
- Joseph Khawam, BA — Titular Bishop of Apamea in Syria, Apostolic Exarch of Venezuela (since 2019)
- Milad Jawish, BS — Bishop of Saint-Sauveur of Montréal (since 2021)
- Francois Beyrouti — Bishop of Newton (since 2022)
- Jean-Marie Chami, Ist.delPrado — Titular Bishop of Tarsus, Patriarchal Vicar of Egypt, Sudan and South Sudan (since 2022)
- Jean Abou Charouche, SMSP – Titular Bishop of Mira, Apostolic Exarch of Argentina (since 2026)

Hierarchs Emeritus:

- Gregory III Laham, BS – Patriarch Emeritus of Antioch and of All the East, of Alexandria and of Jerusalem (since 2017)
- Joseph Kallas, SMSP – Archbishop Emeritus of Beirut and Jbail (since 2010)
- Isidore Battikha, BA, – Archbishop Emeritus of Homs (since 2012)
- Elias Chacour – Archbishop Emeritus of Akka (since 2014)
- Fares Maakaroun, SMSP – Archbishop-bishop Emeritus of Nossa Senhora do Paraíso em São Paulo (since 2014)
- Cyril Salim Bustros, SMSP – Archbishop Emeritus of Beirut and Jbail (since 2018)
- Michel Abrass, BA – Archbishop Emeritus of Tyre (since 2021)
- Issam John Darwich, BS – Archbishop Emeritus of Zehleh and Fuzol (since 2021)
- Nikolaki Sawaf – Archbishop Emeritus of Latakia (since 2021)
- Georges Bakar, Ist.delPrado – Archbishop, Protosyncellus Emeritus of Egypt, Sudan and South Sudan (since 2022)
- Elias Rahal, SMSP – Archbishop Emeritus of Baalbek (since 2025)
- Joseph Gébara – Archbishop Emeritus of Petra and Philadelphia (since 2026)
- Georges Kahhalé Zouhaïraty, BA – Bishop, Apostolic Exarch Emeritus of Venezuela (since 2019)
- Ibrahim Salameh, SMSP – Bishop, Apostolic Exarch Emeritus of Argentina (since 2021)
- Nicholas Samra — Bishop Emeritus of Newton (since 2022)

=== Religious institutes ===
==== Orders of Pontifical right ====
Masculine

- Basilian Aleppian Order [Basilian Aleppine Order of the Melkites, B.A.]
- Basilian Chouerite Order [Basilian Chouerite Order of Saint John the Baptist of the Melkites, B.C.]
- Basilian Salvatorian Order [Basilian Order of the Most Holy Saviour of the Melkites, B.S.]

Feminine

- Basilian Aleppian Sisters [R.B.A.]
- Basilian Chouerite Sisters [R.B.C.]
- Basilian Salvatorian Sisters of the Annunciation [C.S.B.A.] (it)

==== Institutes of Patriarchal right ====
Masculine

- Melkite Missionaries of St. Paul [Society of Missionaries of St. Paul, S.M.S.P.]

Feminine

- Melkite Missionaries of Our Lady of Perpetual Help [Congregation of Missionaries of Our Lady of Perpetual Help, C.M.P.S.]

=== Other ===
There are also several patriarchal organizations with offices and chapters throughout the world, including:

- the Global Melkite Association, a group which networks eparchies, monasteries, schools and Melkite associations
- Friends of the Holy Land, a lay charitable organization active in the diaspora which provides clothing, medicine and liturgical items for churches and communities in the Holy Land (Israel, Palestine, Jordan), Lebanon, Egypt, and Syria.

==== Ecclesiastical decorations ====
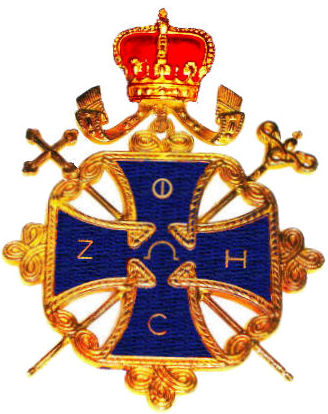
Cross of the Patriarchal Order of the Holy Cross of Jerusalem.

- Patriarchal Order of the Holy Cross of Jerusalem, a honorific lay order founded in 1979, with the Patriarch of Antioch as Grand Master, which promotes religious, cultural, charitable and social works of concern to the Church
- Order of Saint Nicholas, a regional lay order founded in 1991 by Bishop Ignatius Ghattas of the Melkite Greek Catholic Eparchy of Newton

==== Other ====
- Order of Saint Lazarus of Jerusalem (OSLJ), a Christian ecumenical lay order under protection of the Patriarch of Antioch since 1910 (some sources claim since 1841)
- Ordo Militiae Christi Templi Hierosolymitani (OMCTH), a Christian ecumenical organisation with Generalkommandantur (general command) in Cologne, Germany, and a seat in Jerusalem, under protection of the Patriarch of Antioch since 22 September 1990. The Grand Priory of Poland of the OMCTH was granted the Autonomous Statute General on 12 December 2018 by Patriarch Youssef Absi. Grand Priory of Poland was established as the sole Catholic Chivalric Order with the Grand Prior of Poland as the Vicar General of the Order.

== See also ==
- Melkite
- List of Melkite Greek Catholic Patriarchs of Antioch
- Patriarch of Antioch
- Eastern Catholic Churches
- Melkite Greek Catholic Eparchy of Newton
