= Basilian Aleppian Order =

Melkite Greek Catholic religious order

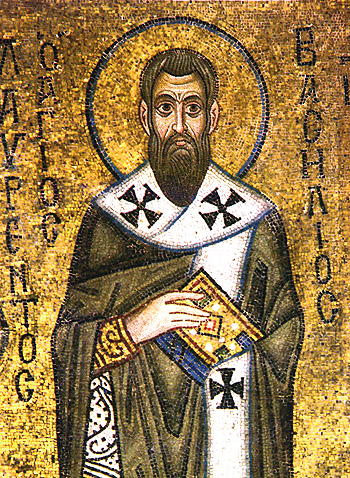
St. Basil the Great. Mosaic, Kiev Hagia Sophia, XI century

The Basilian Aleppian Order (Latin: Ordo Basilianus Aleppensis Melkitarum; French: Ordre Basilien Alepin) is a religious order of the Melkite Greek Catholic Church.

The order was founded in 1697 in Dhour El Shuwayr by Aleppine monks who arrived from the area of Aleppo to follow the Rule of Saint Basil. It was approved in 1710. Between 1824 and 1832 the order split from the main congregation, the Basilian Chouerite Order.

Many prominent bishops have been members of the Basilian Alepian Order such as Cardinal Gabriel Acacius Coussa (1897-1962), Bishop Justin Najmy (1898-1968) and Archbishop Hilarion Capucci (1922-2017).

The female branch of the order, the congregation of Basilian Aleppian Sisters was founded in 1740.

Currently, the headquarters of the order is located in Sarba, Jounieh, Lebanon.

== See also ==
Maronite Religious Institutes (Orders)

- Baladites
- Antonins
- Aleppians
- Kreimists or Lebanese missionaries

Melkite Religious Institutes (Orders)

- Basilian Chouerite Order
- Basilian Salvatorian Order
