= Kyivan Church Study Group =

Unofficial ecumenical dialogue

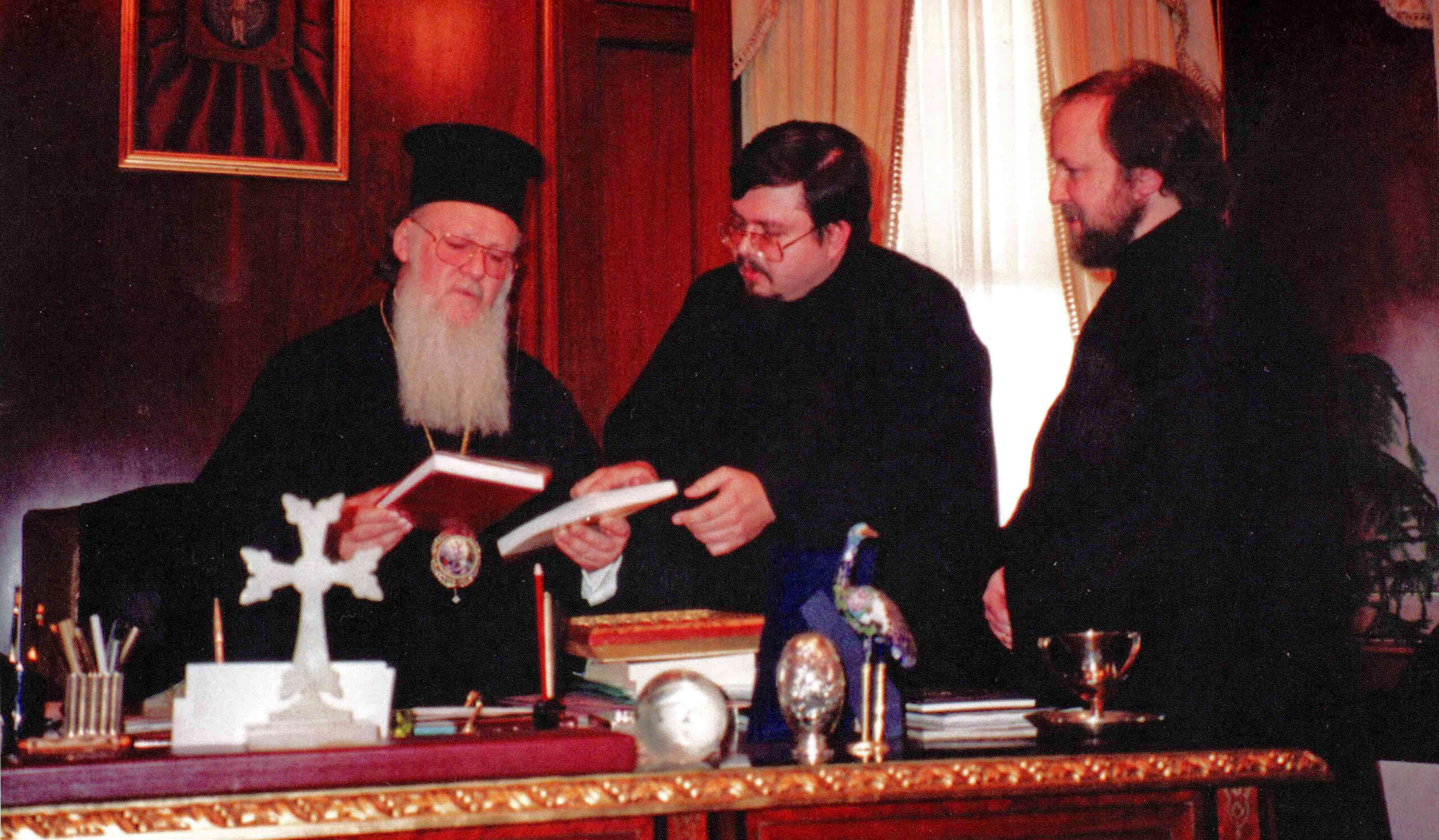
Ecumenical Patriarch Bartholomew I of Constantinople receives Fathers Andriy Chirovsky and Peter Galadza in his office in 1996, following a meeting of the Kyivan Church Study Group

The Kyivan Church Study Group (KCSG), originally known as the Kievan Church Study Group, was an unofficial ecumenical dialogue between bishops and theologians of the Ukrainian Greek Catholic Church and Orthodox churches associated with the Ecumenical Patriarchate of Constantinople. Active from 1992 to 1996, it explored the ecclesiastical identity of the historic Metropolis of Kyiv and the possibility of restoring communion between the Catholic and Orthodox churches descended from it.

Established shortly after Ukraine regained independence in 1991, the group brought together prominent Catholic and Orthodox theologians to examine their common ecclesiastical, theological, liturgical, and spiritual inheritance, rooted in the Baptism of Kyivan Rus' under Vladimir the Great in 988. Its discussions included the possibility of restoring communion between the Ukrainian Greek Catholic Church and Constantinople without severing its existing communion with Rome.

The group's participants included Orthodox theologian Kallistos Ware, Bishop Vsevolod Maydansky, and Ukrainian Greek Catholic theologians Andriy Chirovsky, Peter Galadza, Myroslaw Tataryn, and Borys Gudziak. Its theological discussions contributed to debates concerning Eastern Catholic ecclesiology, Catholic–Orthodox relations, and the historical identity of the Church of Kyiv.

== History ==
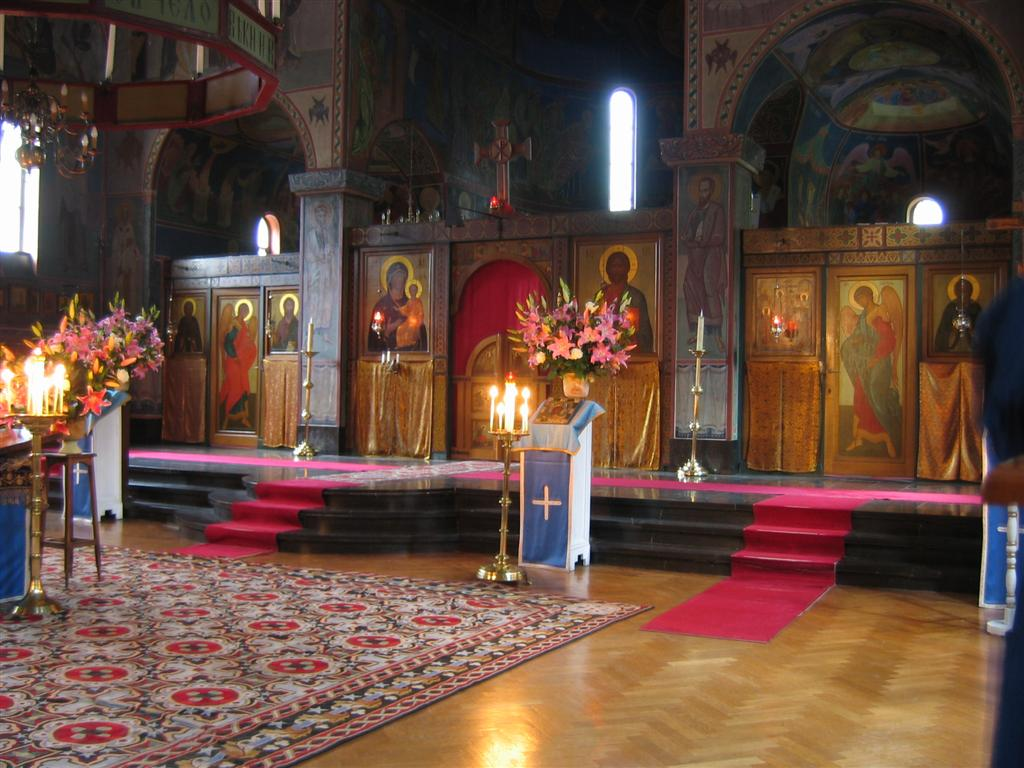
Chevetogne Abbey in Belgium, a Benedictine monastery dedicated to Catholic–Orthodox reconciliation and one of the venues of the Kyivan Church Study Group's consultations.

The Kyivan Church Study Group emerged during a period of significant religious transformation following Ukrainian independence and the re-emergence of the Ukrainian Greek Catholic Church from decades of Soviet suppression.

Its first consultation took place at Saints Gregory and Macrina House in Oxford, England, from 8 to 10 August 1992. The group subsequently held consultations in Stamford, Connecticut, Ottawa, Chevetogne , Rome, and Constantinople. It conducted seven consultations before ceasing regular activity in 1996.

The initiative received encouragement from Ecumenical Patriarch Bartholomew I and Ukrainian Greek Catholic Cardinal Myroslav Ivan Lubachivsky. However, the group remained an unofficial theological forum rather than a commission empowered to negotiate ecclesiastical union.

The name "Kyivan Church Study Group" reflected its participants' emphasis on the common historical identity of the Church of Kyiv. The group adopted the Ukrainian-derived spelling "Kyivan" in place of the earlier "Kievan".

The group's proceedings were published principally in Logos: A Journal of Eastern Christian Studies, associated with the Metropolitan Andrey Sheptytsky Institute of Eastern Christian Studies, and in Eastern Churches Journal.

== Theological aims ==
=== Identity of the Kyivan Church ===
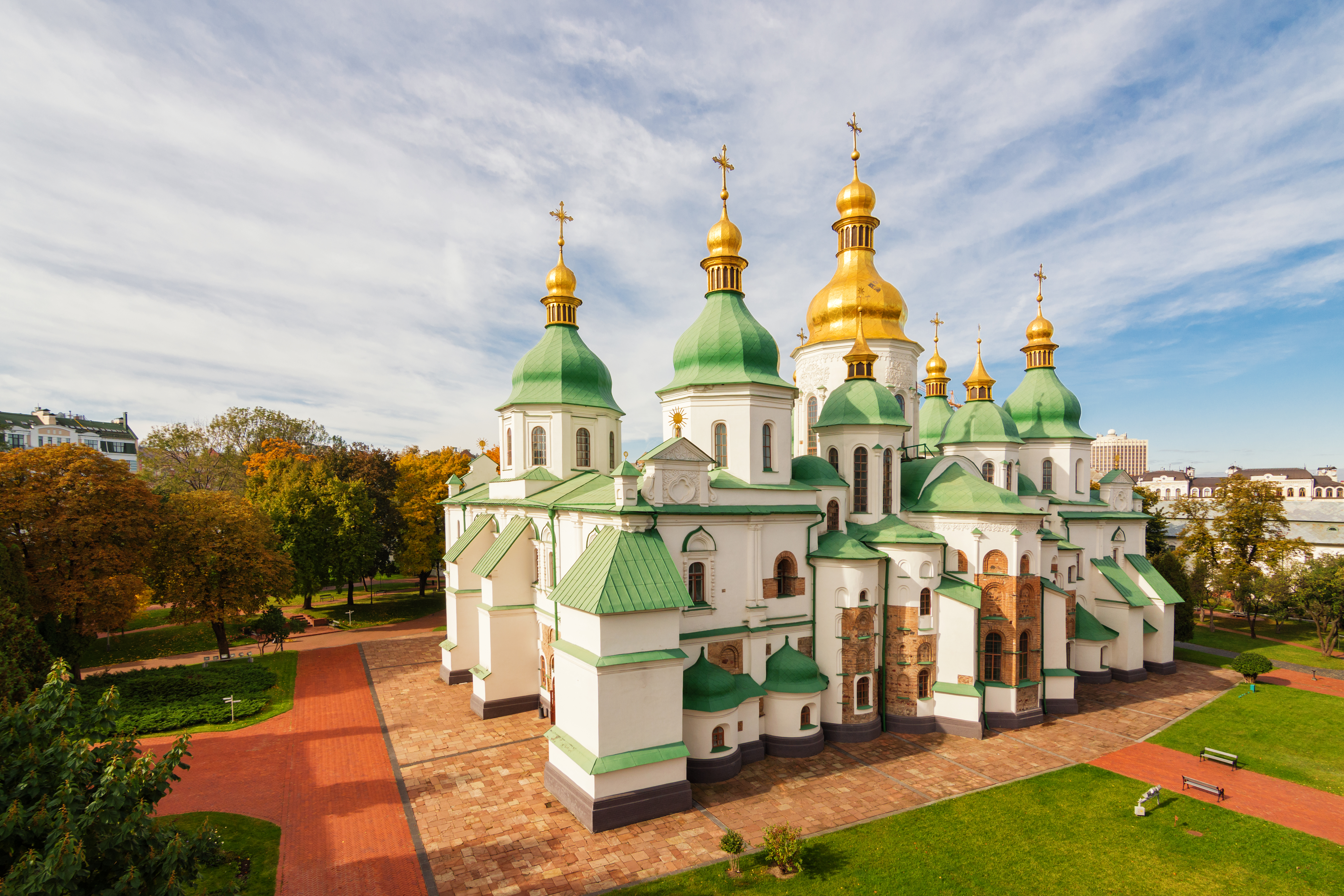
Saint Sophia's Cathedral in Kyiv, a historic center of the medieval Metropolis of Kyiv and a symbol of the common ecclesiastical heritage of Ukrainian Catholics and Orthodox Christians

The group's central concern was the ecclesiastical identity of the historic See of Kyiv and its relationship with Rome and Constantinople.

Participants examined the common inheritance of churches descended from the medieval Kyivan Metropolitanate, including their shared origins in the baptism of Kyivan Rus', Byzantine liturgical tradition, and the ecclesiastical history preceding the Union of Brest in 1596.

The consultations explored whether this common patrimony could provide a foundation for renewed ecclesiastical unity. Rather than treating reconciliation solely as a question between the Roman Catholic and Eastern Orthodox churches, the group considered the possibility of restoring unity within the historic Kyivan Church itself.

This approach emerged amid debates over the historical identity, ecclesiastical autonomy, and canonical jurisdiction of the Ukrainian churches following the dissolution of the Soviet Union.

=== Communion with Rome and Constantinople ===
One of the group's most distinctive discussions concerned whether the Ukrainian Greek Catholic Church could restore communion with the Ecumenical Patriarchate without breaking its existing communion with Rome.

This possibility paralleled the concept of dual communion associated with Melkite Greek Catholic Archbishop Elias Zoghby, whose proposals for Catholic–Orthodox reconciliation similarly questioned whether communion with Rome and communion with the Orthodox East necessarily had to be mutually exclusive.

Orthodox Bishop Vsevolod Maydansky addressed the question directly in his 1993 paper, "Does the Restoration of Communion between Constantinople and the Greco-Catholic Church of Kiev Require a Break of Communion with Rome?"

The group also examined papal and patriarchal primacy, the autonomy of particular churches, the historical circumstances of the Union of Brest, and the relationship between Eastern Catholic and Orthodox understandings of the Church.

== Participants ==
The group included bishops, priests, and theologians from both Roman and Constantinopolitan communion. Its initial membership and subsequent additions were recorded in Logos in 1993.

=== Orthodox participants ===
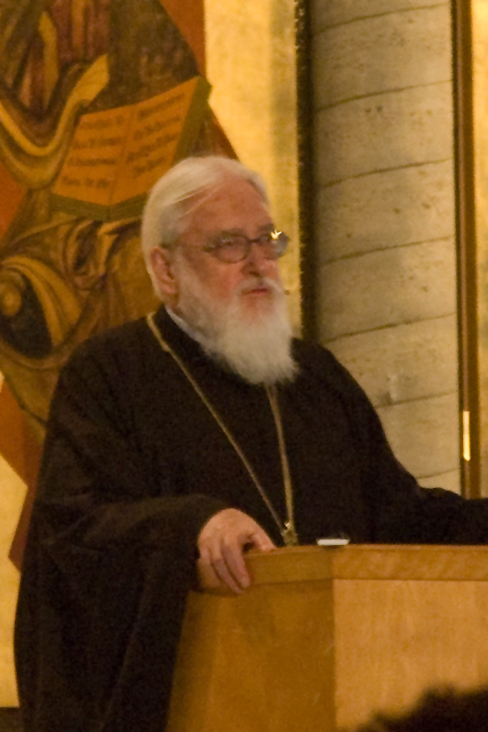
Kallistos Ware, an Orthodox theologian and participant in the Kyivan Church Study Group, photographed in 2008.

- Kallistos Ware – Bishop of Diokleia and Orthodox theologian at the University of Oxford
- Vsevolod (Majdansky) – Bishop of Scopelos
- Ephrem Lash – Archimandrite and liturgical translator
- Oleh Kravchenko – Orthodox archpriest
- Emmanuel Clapsis – Orthodox protopresbyter and theologian
- Anthony Ugolnik – Orthodox priest and scholar
- Ihor Kutash – Orthodox priest
- Roman Yereniuk – Theologian and scholar of Ukrainian Christianity

=== Ukrainian Greek Catholic participants ===
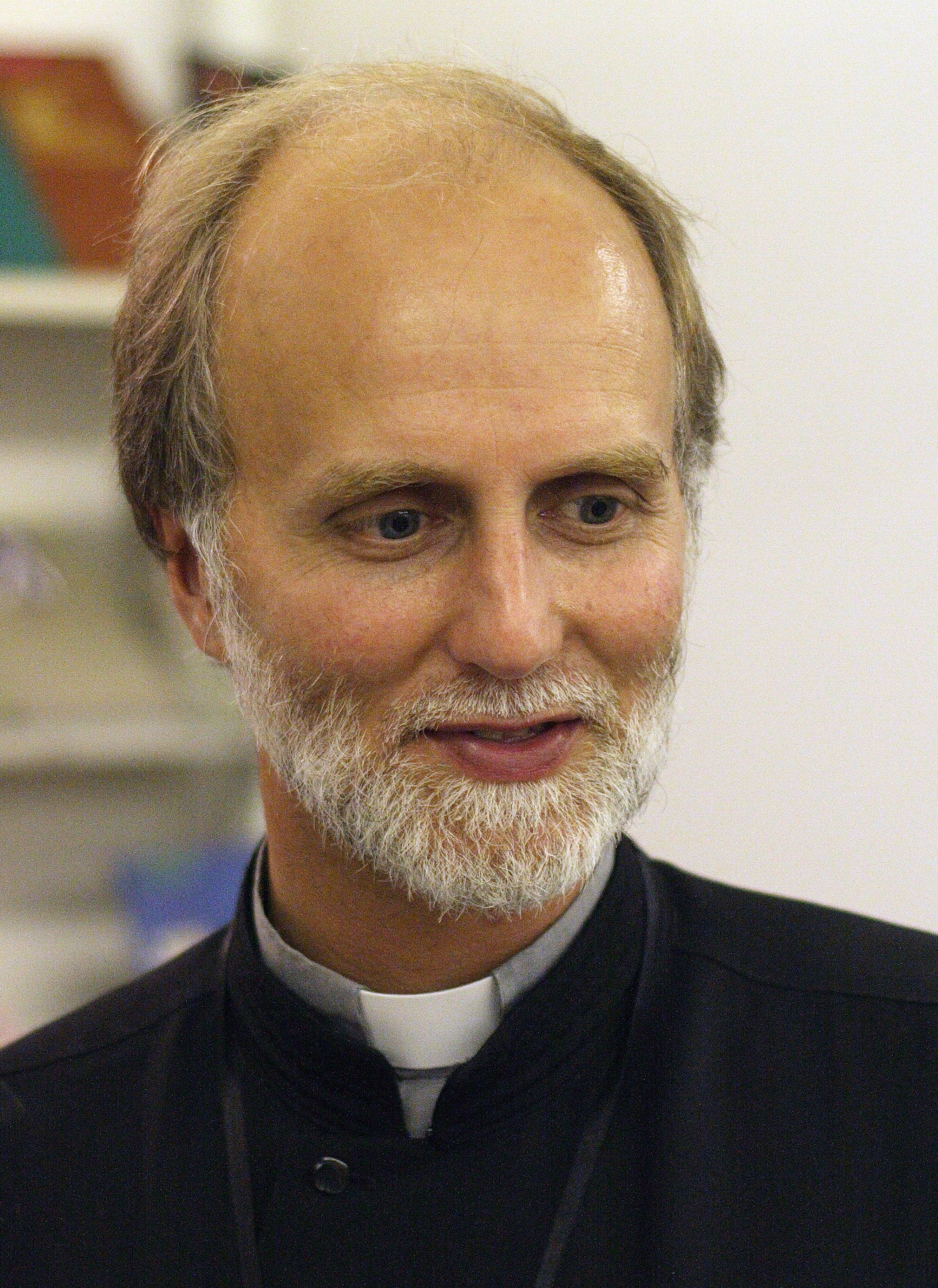
Borys Gudziak, a participant in the Kyivan Church Study Group who later became rector of the Ukrainian Catholic University and metropolitan archbishop of Philadelphia.

- Basil Losten – Bishop of Stamford
- Boniface Luykx – Archimandrite and liturgical scholar
- Serge Kelleher – Archimandrite and theologian
- Myroslaw Tataryn – Priest and theologian
- Peter Galadza – Priest and liturgical theologian
- Andriy Onuferko – Priest and canon lawyer
- Andriy Chirovsky – Priest, theologian, and founder of the Sheptytsky Institute
- Borys Gudziak – Historian and later metropolitan archbishop of Philadelphia
- Julian Voronovsky – Bishop of Lviv
- Pavlo Vasylyk – Bishop of Ivano-Frankivsk
- Maxim Hermaniuk – Metropolitan of Winnipeg
- Roman Mirchuk – Ukrainian Greek Catholic priest

== Legacy ==
Although the Kyivan Church Study Group did not achieve formal ecclesiastical reconciliation, its consultations contributed to theological discussions concerning the common identity and historical inheritance of the Church of Kyiv. Its work explored possibilities for overcoming divisions between the Catholic and Orthodox descendants of the Kyivan Metropolitanate while preserving their relationships with Rome and Constantinople.

A retrospective published in The Ukrainian Weekly in 2004 described the group's work as an important contribution to Catholic–Orthodox dialogue and argued that its activities had ended prematurely. The article also reported that Kallistos Ware had called for renewed input from the group during an Orientale Lumen conference earlier that year.

=== Theological education and scholarship ===
The group's work was closely associated with the Metropolitan Andrey Sheptytsky Institute of Eastern Christian Studies, founded by participant Andriy Chirovsky in 1986. Its proceedings appeared in the institute's journal, Logos: A Journal of Eastern Christian Studies, and its discussions formed part of the wider scholarly exploration of Eastern Catholic identity, ecclesiology, and Catholic–Orthodox relations.

Several participants, including Chirovsky, Peter Galadza, and Borys Gudziak, subsequently held prominent roles in Eastern Christian theological education. Gudziak became rector of the Lviv Theological Academy and founding rector of its successor, the Ukrainian Catholic University. The group's theological concerns, particularly the ecclesiastical identity of the Kyivan Church and its relationship with the wider Christian East, continued to be explored within the academic networks associated with these institutions.

The group also brought together scholars influential in Orthodox theological education, notably Kallistos Ware, whose teaching and scholarship contributed to the development of contemporary Orthodox theology.

=== Orientale Lumen conferences ===
The Kyivan Church Study Group influenced the development of the Orientale Lumen ecumenical conferences, established in 1997 to promote dialogue among Catholic and Orthodox Christians.

A 1999 report in The Ukrainian Weekly identified the Kyivan Church Study Group and Pope John Paul II's apostolic letter Orientale Lumen as inspirations for the conferences. Bishop Vsevolod Maydansky, a participant in the KCSG, also served on the conferences' planning committee.

In 2001, conference chair John Figel again credited the study group with helping expand ecumenical discussions. The conferences continued to address subjects central to the KCSG's work, including papal primacy, conciliarity, and the ecclesiastical relationship between the Christian East and West.

=== Attempts to revive the group ===
Although the Kyivan Church Study Group ceased holding regular consultations in 1996, efforts were subsequently made to revive its activities and extend its dialogue to Orthodox jurisdictions within Ukraine. In 1998, participant Peter Galadza met with representatives of the principal Ukrainian Orthodox jurisdictions to explore the possibility of convening a consultation in Kyiv.

According to a 2002 retrospective by Taras Hrynchyshyn, Patriarch Filaret expressed reservations about the proposed dialogue, arguing that the restoration of Eucharistic communion between Ukrainian Orthodox and Greek Catholics could not be accomplished independently of the wider Orthodox and Catholic churches. By contrast, Archbishop Ihor Isichenko of the Ukrainian Autocephalous Orthodox Church expressed willingness to participate. He proposed concentrating initially on cooperation in theological education and the translation of theological literature, describing the study group as a suitable model for cooperation among Orthodox, Greek Catholic, and Roman Catholic churches.

In 2016, KCSG founder Andriy Chirovsky likewise called for the revival of the group to explore restoring communion between the Ukrainian Greek Catholic Church and Constantinople without severing communion with Rome.

Isichenko's own eparchy had begun pursuing reconciliation with the Ukrainian Greek Catholic Church in 2015. The process culminated in 2022, when three parishes of his former Orthodox eparchy entered the Ukrainian Greek Catholic Church.

=== Ukrainian Orthodox autocephaly ===
The Unification council of the Eastern Orthodox churches of Ukraine in Kyiv, which established the Orthodox Church of Ukraine in December 2018.

The Kyivan Church Study Group's examination of the historical and ecclesiastical identity of the Metropolis of Kyiv anticipated several questions central to the establishment of the Orthodox Church of Ukraine in 2018–2019. Its participants studied the historical relationship between Kyiv and the Ecumenical Patriarchate of Constantinople, ecclesiastical autonomy, and the possibility of overcoming divisions within the historic Kyivan Church. The group maintained direct contact with Ecumenical Patriarch Bartholomew I, whom its members met during consultations in Constantinople and at Halki. In a 2018 interview, KCSG founder Andriy Chirovsky recalled that Bartholomew had personally expressed interest in the group's publications in Logos. In 2016, Chirovsky also discussed Constantinople's historical and canonical claims concerning Ukraine, including its status as the mother church of the Kyivan Metropolitanate.

Several Orthodox participants had connections to the subsequent movement for Ukrainian autocephaly. Archbishop Vsevolod Maydansky participated in the 1996 unification of two Ukrainian Orthodox jurisdictions in North America and was reportedly considered as a possible leader of a unified Ukrainian Orthodox Church in 2001. His successor as Bishop of Chicago, Archbishop Daniel Zelinsky, was appointed an exarch of the Ecumenical Patriarchate in September 2018 and helped negotiate the establishment of the new church.

Another connection involved Metropolitan Job Getcha, who articulated Constantinople's canonical position on Ukrainian autocephaly in 2018. Getcha studied at St. Andrew's College in Winnipeg from 1992 to 1996, when KCSG participant Roman Yereniuk served as principal. Yereniuk's doctoral research examined the Kyivan Metropolitanate between 1686 and 1730, the historical period central to the later jurisdictional dispute. Getcha also explicitly acknowledged another KCSG participant, Orthodox protopresbyter Oleh Krawchenko, as one of his theological teachers. Other KCSG participants, including Kallistos Ware and Emmanuel Clapsis, contributed to scholarly discussions of Ukrainian autocephaly and Orthodox ecclesiology in the years preceding the council.

The 2018 Unification council of the Eastern Orthodox churches of Ukraine elected Epiphanius as primate of the newly established Orthodox Church of Ukraine, which received a tomos of autocephaly from Constantinople in January 2019. Although the KCSG had no institutional role in the council, its earlier scholarship and the subsequent activities of its participants illustrate intellectual and personal connections between the ecumenical discussions of the 1990s and the Ukrainian autocephaly process. Unlike the KCSG, whose objectives included reconciliation between the Catholic and Orthodox descendants of the Kyivan Church, the 2018 council concerned Orthodox unification alone; the Ukrainian Greek Catholic Church did not participate.

== See also ==
- Metropolitan Andrey Sheptytsky Institute of Eastern Christian Studies
- Ukrainian Catholic University
- Union of Brest
- Orthodox Church of Ukraine
- Orientale Lumen
- Elias Zoghby
- Ecumenical Patriarchate of Constantinople
