= Serge Keleher =

American-Ukrainian Greek Catholic priest

- Church: Ukrainian Greek Catholic Church

Orders
- Rank: Archimandrite

Personal details
- Born: Brian Eugene Regis Keleher; June 7, 1942 New York City, United States
- Died: November 11, 2011 (aged 69) Dublin, Ireland
- Education: Michigan State University; University of St. Michael's College

Serge Keleher (7 June 1942 – 11 November 2011), born Brian Eugene Regis Keleher, was an American-born Ukrainian Greek Catholic priest, archimandrite, liturgical scholar, and historian of Eastern Christianity. He was known for his research on the persecution and revival of the Ukrainian Greek Catholic Church in the Soviet Union, his work in Catholic–Orthodox relations, and his pastoral ministry among Ukrainian Catholics in Ireland.

== Life and ministry ==
Keleher was born in New York City to Irish-American parents. He entered the Eastern Orthodox Church in 1961 and was ordained an Orthodox priest in 1967. In 1970, Archbishop Joseph Raya received him into the Catholic Church, after which he served in the Ukrainian Greek Catholic Eparchy of Toronto. He subsequently worked as private secretary to Bishop Isidore Borecky and was elevated to the rank of mitrophoric archimandrite in 1988.

During the late 1980s and early 1990s, Keleher worked with Keston College in Oxford, researching religious persecution in the Soviet Union and the revival of the Ukrainian Greek Catholic Church. He was a founding participant in the Kyivan Church Study Group, an ecumenical initiative bringing together Ukrainian Greek Catholic and Orthodox theologians under the Ecumenical Patriarchate of Constantinople. Keleher helped facilitate the relationship between Bishops Basil Losten and Vsevolod Maydansky, which contributed to the group's formation in 1992.

Keleher was also a translator and editor of the works of Eastern Catholic historian Cyril Korolevsky. He translated and revised Korolevsky's biography of Metropolitan Andrey Sheptytsky, published in English as Metropolitan Andrew (1865–1944) in 1993, and translated his influential essay on Uniatism. His work contributed to the English-language dissemination of Korolevsky's scholarship on Eastern Catholic history and ecclesiology.

He was closely associated with the Society of Saint John Chrysostom and its American counterpart, the Orientale Lumen Foundation, collaborating with founder Jack Figel on the Eastern Churches Journal and supporting the Orientale Lumen ecumenical conferences and publications. He served as the journal's founding editor beginning in 1993–1994.

Keleher spent his later years in Dublin, where he ministered to the local Ukrainian Greek Catholic community. He died there on 11 November 2011, aged 69.

== Selected publications ==
- Passion and Resurrection: The Greek Catholic Church in Soviet Ukraine, 1939–1989 (1993).
- Cyril Korolevsky, Metropolitan Andrew (1865–1944) (1993), translated and revised by Serge Keleher.
- Cyril Korolevsky, Uniatism, translated by Serge Keleher.
- "Orthodox Rivalry in the Twentieth Century: Moscow Versus Constantinople", Religion, State & Society, vol. 25, no. 2 (1997), pp. 125–137. doi:10.1080/09637499708431772
