= Orientalium =

Orientalium may refer to:

- Orientalium Ecclesiarum is the Decree on the Eastern Catholic Churches from the Second Vatican Council
- Orientalium dignitas is an 1894 encyclical of Pope Leo XIII
- The Pontificium Institutum Orientalium is the premier center for the study of Eastern Christianity in Rome, Italy
- The Corpus Scriptorum Christianorum Orientalium is an important bilingual collection of Eastern Christian texts with over 600 volumes published 1903
