= Andriy Chirovsky =

Ukrainian Greek Catholic priest and theologian

- Mitred Archpriest
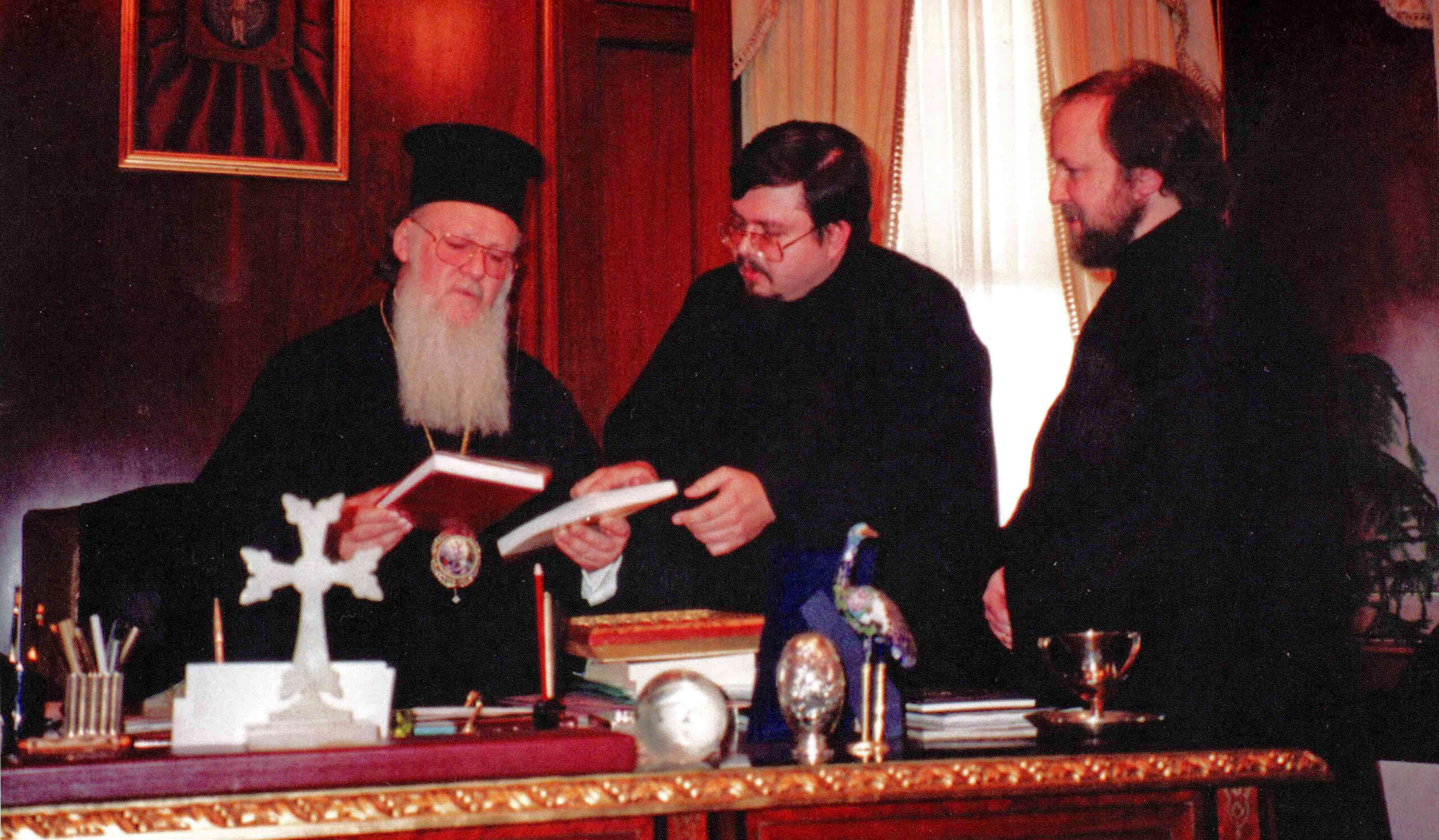
- Andriy Chirovsky with Ecumenical Patriarch Bartholomew I of Constantinople and Peter Galadza
- Native name: Андрій Чировський
- Church: Ukrainian Greek Catholic Church
- Diocese: Eparchy of Saint Nicholas of Chicago

Orders
- Ordination: 1980 by Josyf Slipyj
- Rank: Mitred Archpriest

Personal details
- Born: 1956 (age 69–70) New Jersey, United States
- Spouse: Halyna Pawlyshyn
- Children: 2
- Occupation: Priest, theologian, professor
- Education: Pontifical Urban University (Ph.B.); University of St. Michael's College (M.A.); University of Saint Mary of the Lake (S.T.D.)

Andriy Chirovsky (born 1956) is a Ukrainian Greek Catholic priest, theologian, and scholar of Eastern Christianity. He founded the Metropolitan Andrey Sheptytsky Institute of Eastern Christian Studies in 1986 and has written on Eastern Christian spirituality, sophiology, ecclesiology, and Catholic–Orthodox relations. His scholarship has focused particularly on the theological and spiritual writings of Metropolitan Andrey Sheptytsky.

== Early life and education ==
Chirovsky was born in 1956 in New Jersey, United States. He studied philosophy at the Pontifical Urban University in Rome, receiving a bachelor's degree in 1976, and earned a master's degree in theology from the University of St. Michael's College in Toronto in 1981. He completed a Doctor of Sacred Theology degree at the University of Saint Mary of the Lake in 1993.

He was ordained a priest of the Ukrainian Greek Catholic Church by Patriarch Josyf Slipyj in Castel Gandolfo in 1980. In 2005, Patriarch Lubomyr Husar elevated him to the rank of mitred archpriest in recognition of his work in theological education and the development of the Sheptytsky Institute.

== Academic career ==
Chirovsky began teaching at Catholic Theological Union (CTU) in Chicago in 1984, becoming an assistant professor in 1985. In 1986, he founded the Metropolitan Andrey Sheptytsky Institute of Eastern Christian Studies at CTU, establishing an academic center dedicated to the theology, spirituality, history, and liturgical traditions of Eastern Christianity, particularly those of the Kyivan Church.

The institute relocated to Ottawa, Canada, in 1990 and became an academic unit of Saint Paul University in 1992. Chirovsky subsequently served as an associate professor and later a full professor at Saint Paul University, holding the Peter and Doris Kule Chair of Eastern Christian Theology and Spirituality. He also maintained an adjunct appointment at Catholic Theological Union and taught at Arizona State University.

The Sheptytsky Institute relocated to the University of St. Michael's College at the University of Toronto in 2017.

Chirovsky has served as editor-in-chief of Logos: A Journal of Eastern Christian Studies and as president of the Canadian Association of Eastern Christian Studies.

=== Ukrainian Catholic University ===
Chirovsky participated in efforts to restore theological education in Ukraine following the re-emergence of the Ukrainian Greek Catholic Church from Soviet suppression.

From 1992 to 1994, he served on the curriculum committee involved in re-establishing the Lviv Theological Academy, the predecessor of the Ukrainian Catholic University. He subsequently served on the academy's Board of Guardians from 1995 to 2003 and was a consultant to the Ukrainian Catholic University on its campus church and pastoral center.

In 2005, the university recognized his contributions to the restoration of theological education in the Ukrainian Greek Catholic Church.

== Theological scholarship ==
=== Sophiology and Metropolitan Andrey Sheptytsky ===
Chirovsky's research has focused extensively on the theology and spirituality of Metropolitan Andrey Sheptytsky, particularly his understanding of Divine Wisdom (Sophia).

His monograph Pray for God's Wisdom: The Mystical Sophiology of Metropolitan Andrey Sheptytsky (1992) examines Sheptytsky's writings on Divine Wisdom, including his treatise The Wisdom of God, and considers the relationship between divine and human wisdom, mystical experience, and divinization.

The study compares Sheptytsky's treatment of Sophia with the theological and philosophical approaches of Vladimir Solovyov, Sergei Bulgakov, and Pavel Florensky, as well as earlier patristic and medieval theological traditions. It examines Sheptytsky's understanding of Divine Wisdom as a divine attribute, a gift of the Holy Spirit, and a principle associated with the spiritual transformation of the human person.

Chirovsky's treatment of Bulgakov places his study within the broader history of modern Eastern Christian sophiology, a subject also associated with the Russian Orthodox theological émigré community in Paris, particularly the St. Sergius Orthodox Theological Institute.

=== Ecclesiology and the Kyivan Church Study Group ===
Chirovsky has also written on the ecclesial identity of the Ukrainian Greek Catholic Church, its relationship with the Orthodox churches, and the theological implications of communion with Rome.

In 1992, he initiated the Kyivan Church Study Group, an ecumenical initiative bringing together Eastern Catholic and Ukrainian Orthodox scholars to examine questions of ecclesial identity and reconciliation within the Kyivan Christian tradition.

His paper "Toward an Ecclesial Self-Identity for the Ukrainian Greco-Catholic Church" was published in the 1994 volume of Logos: A Journal of Eastern Christian Studies, which included theological discussions associated with the study group.

His other writings on ecclesiology include "Orthodox in Communion with Rome: The Antinomic Character of Eastern Catholic Theology" (1998) and "From Sheptytsky to Shevchuk: The Maturation of Ecclesial Autonomy in the Catholic Church of Kyiv" (2011).

== Selected publications ==
- Pray for God's Wisdom: The Mystical Sophiology of Metropolitan Andrey Sheptytsky. Metropolitan Andrey Sheptytsky Institute of Eastern Christian Studies, 1992. ISBN 1-897937-00-0.
- "Toward an Ecclesial Self-Identity for the Ukrainian Greco-Catholic Church." Logos: A Journal of Eastern Christian Studies, vol. 35 (1994), pp. 83–123.
- "The 'Final Solution?': Reflections on Recent Orthodox Statements Concerning Eastern Catholics." Logos: A Journal of Eastern Christian Studies, vol. 37 (1996), pp. 7–33.
- "Orthodox in Communion with Rome: The Antinomic Character of Eastern Catholic Theology." Logos: A Journal of Eastern Christian Studies, vol. 39, no. 1 (1998), pp. 71–87.
- "From Sheptytsky to Shevchuk: The Maturation of Ecclesial Autonomy in the Catholic Church of Kyiv." Logos: A Journal of Eastern Christian Studies, vol. 52, nos. 1–2 (2011), pp. 1–12.
