= Metropolitan Andrey Sheptytsky Institute of Eastern Christian Studies =

Christian Institute

- Established: 1986
- Faculty: Peter Galadza, Andriy Chirovsky, Brian Butcher, Alexander Laschuk
- Address: Windle House, 81 St. Mary Street
- Location: University of St. Michael's College, Toronto, Canada
- Website: www.sheptytskyinstitute.ca

The Metropolitan Andrey Sheptytsky Institute of Eastern Christian Studies (MASI) is an autonomous unit of the Faculty of Theology at the University of St. Michael's College in the University of Toronto, Canada. It specializes in Eastern Christian studies in all its breadth. Special emphasis is placed on the tradition of the Church of Kyiv, although courses, seminars, and conferences also deal with aspects of the theology, spirituality, history, and ecclesial polity of all the Eastern Christian churches — the Eastern Orthodox, Oriental non-Chalcedonian, Assyrian, and Eastern Catholic Churches.

Through the Faculty of Theology, the Sheptytsky Institute offers seven graduate programs:

- Conjoint Certificate in Theological Studies
- Master of Theological Studies (MTS)
- Master of Divinity (M.Div.)
- Master of Arts in Theological Studies (MA)
- Master of Theology (Th.M.)
- Doctor of Philosophy in Theological Studies (Ph.D.)
- Doctor of Ministry (D.Min.)

Current course offerings include:

- Eastern Christian Encounters with Islam
- General Introduction to the Eastern Churches
- Byzantine Christian Sacraments
- Foundations of Eastern Christian Theology
- the Three-Personed God: Eastern Christian Perspectives
- Twentieth-Century Eastern Christian Sacramental Theology
- The Canonical Tradition of the Christian East

In 2017, Cardinal Thomas Collins, Archbishop of Toronto, called the Sheptytsky Institute a "great spiritual and intellectual treasure" of the Ukrainian Catholic Church, and a "glorious enrichment to St. Michael's College".

== History ==
Named after Metropolitan of Galicia and Archbishop of Halych Andrey Sheptytsky, O.S.B.M., the Sheptytsky Institute was founded in 1986 by Fr. Andriy Chirovsky at the Catholic Theological Union in Chicago. In September 1990, the Sheptytsky Institute moved to Ottawa, and in May 1992 became an academic unit of the Faculty of Theology at Saint Paul University.

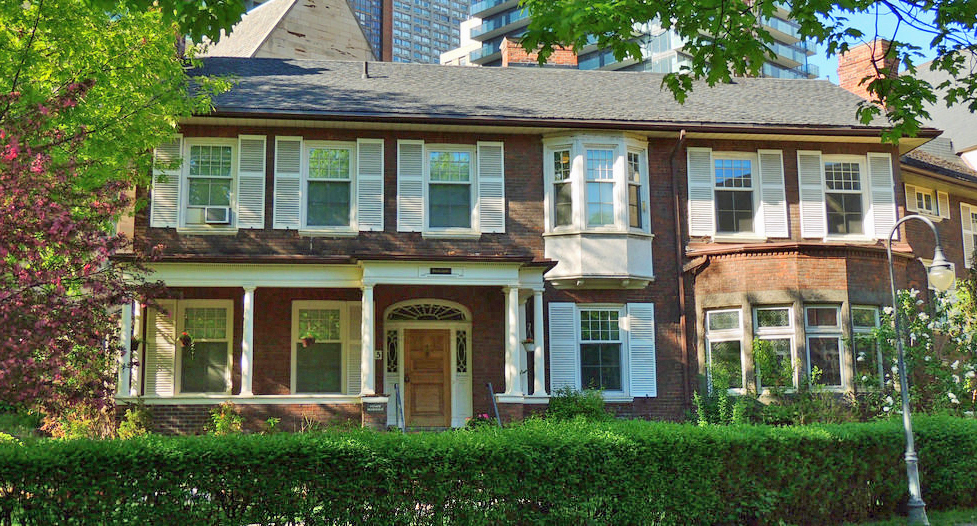
The institute is located in Windle House at St Michael's College

On July 1, 2017, the Sheptytsky Institute moved from Saint Paul University to its new home at the University of St. Michael's College in Toronto.

Current, full-time and seasonal faculty includes the Right Rev. Dr. Andriy Chirovsky, Very Rev. Dr. Peter Galadza, Subdeacon Dr. Brian Butcher, Dr. Daniel Galadza and Rev. Dr. Alexander Laschuk.

An endowment from the Metropolitan Andrey Sheptytsky Institute Foundation, operating under the aegis of the Ukrainian Catholic Bishops of Canada, funds the institute's work.

== Scholarly activities ==
In addition to its university degree programs in Eastern Christian Studies, since 1987, the Sheptytsky Institute has offered month-long summer intensive programs. Past locations included:

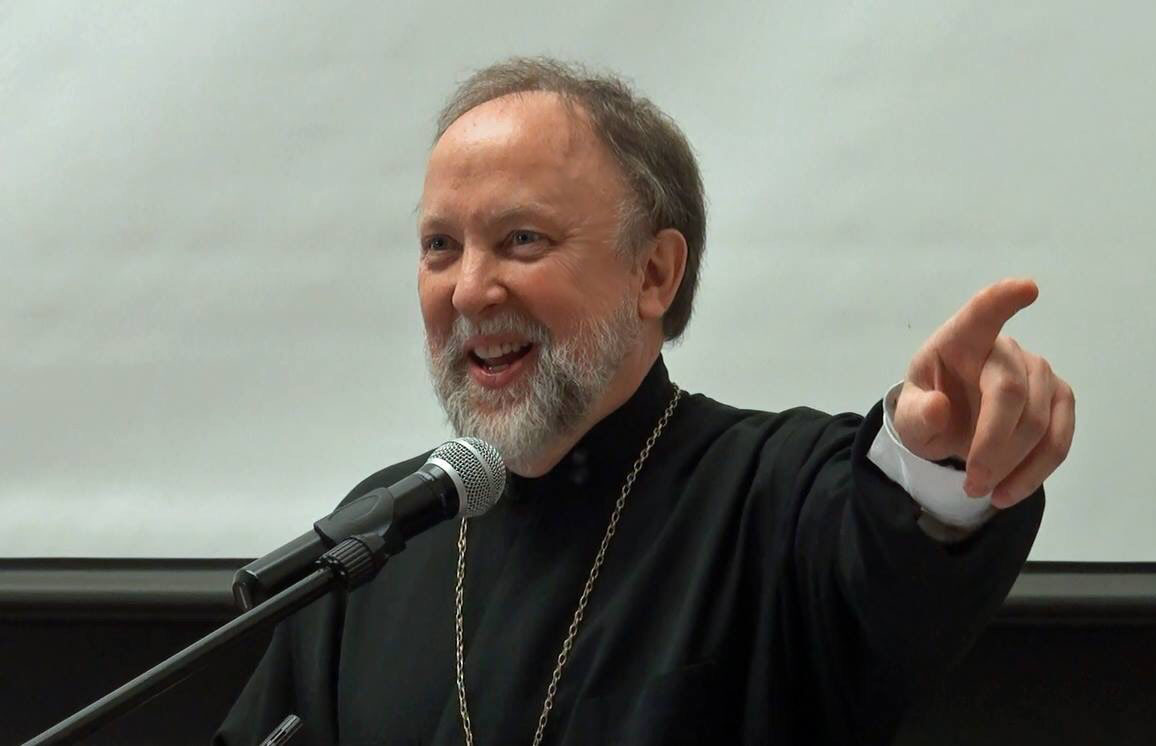
- Very Rev. Dr. Peter Galadza, Director of the Metropolitan Andrey Sheptytsky Institute
  Holy Transfiguration (Mount Tabor) Monastery in Redwood Valley, California
- Mother of God Monastery in Orangeville, Ontario
- Holy Spirit Seminary in Ottawa

In 1996, the Institute began co-sponsoring a summer program at the Univ Lavra, near Lviv, Ukraine, together with the Ukrainian Catholic University. In 2008 the Sheptytsky Institute created the first "Study Days" in Ottawa, later spreading to Edmonton. Guest speakers have included Thomas Hopko, Frederica Mathewes-Green, Robert F. Taft, Timothy Kelleher, Sr. Vassa Larin, Myroslaw Tataryn, Suzette Phillips, Martha Shepherd, and John Behr.

The institute's Byzantine Rite Chapel of St. Sophia and Her Daughters, Faith, Hope and Love, holds services in English, French, Ukrainian, and other languages such as Greek and Church Slavonic.

September 2017 the Institute launched a series of presentations, "Thursdays at Sheptytsky," and in January 2018 it expanded it to "Tuesdays and Thursdays at Sheptytsky". Seminars, and authors of books that have been launched, include:

- Marshall McLuhan by Logan - for Theologians and Liturgists, Dr. Robert Logan
- Book launch Byzantinization in Jerusalem, Daniel Galadza
- Rome and the Christians of Persia: Competition and Cooperation, Michael Bonner
- Fr. Mykhailo Zubrytsky and the Formation of Nineteenth-Century Greco-Catholic Clergy, Frank Sysyn
- The Jesus Prayer: An Introduction to a Classic Form of Eastern Christian Meditation, Shawn Goldman
- What is Eastern Catholic Theology? Brian Butcher
- Apokatastasis and Angelology in Sergius Bulgakov, Liam Farrer
- Newly Canonized and Newly Discovered Saints of the Kyivan Church: An Overview, Dr. Alexander Roman
- My Life's Work, Victor Malarek
- Book launch The Architectonics of Hope, Kyle Gingerich Hiebert
- Book launch Liturgical Theology after Schmemann, Brian Butcher

== Scholarly publications ==
The Sheptytsky Institute catalogue includes over 115 scholarly books published in English, Ukrainian, French, German, and Greek. Titles include:

- The Metropolitan Andrey Sheptytsky Institute of Eastern Christian Studies: Serving for the Future, Leading with Tradition, Peter Galadza, Editor (2014)
- Archbishop Andrei Sheptytsky and the Ukrainian Jewish Bond, Peter Galadza, Editor (2014)
- Unité en Division: Lettres de Lev Gillet à Andrei Cheptytsky 1921–29 un moine de l'église d'orient, Peter Galadza (2009) ISBN 9782845737235
- Eastern Christians in the New World: An Historical and Canonical Study of the Ukrainian Catholic Church in Canada, David Motiuk (2005)
- The Divine Liturgy: An Anthology for Worship, Rev. Peter Galadza, Editor-in-Chief; Joseph Roll, Associate Editor; J. Michael Thompson, Associate Editor; Rt. Rev. Roman Galadza; Rev. John Sianchuk, CSSR (2004) ISBN 9781895937121
- The Theology and Liturgical Work of Andrei Sheptytsky (1865–1944), Peter Galadza (2004), co-published with the Rome Pontifical Oriental Institute ISBN 9788872103456
- Christian Social Ethics in Ukraine – the Legacy of Andrei Sheptytsky, Andrii Krawchuk (1997), co-published with the Canadian Institute of Ukrainian Studies Press ISBN 9781895937046
- Following the Star from the East: Essays in Honour of Archimandrite Boniface Luykx, Andriy Chirovsky, Editor (1992) ISBN 9781895937039
- Pray for God’s Wisdom: The Mystical Sophiology of Metropolitan Andrey Sheptytsky, Andriy Chirovsky (1992) ISBN 9781895937008

The institute also publishes LOGOS: A Journal of Eastern Christian Studies which is Canada's only double-blind peer-reviewed journal in the field. LOGOS is a tri-lingual (English, French, Ukrainian) theological review that focuses on Eastern Christian Studies, emphasizing both Orthodox and Catholic Eastern Churches with a special, but not exclusive, interest in the Church of Kyiv.

Other material published by the Sheptytsky Institute include DVDs and CDs for instruction in congregational singing and recordings of plenary sessions from the Study Days. In 1992 Fr. Andriy Chirovsky produced a 6-hour DVD course on how to create Byzantine-style icons using traditional methods.

== International conferences and media ==
The institute organized the conference "The Vatican II (Second Vatican Council) Decree on the Eastern Catholic Churches, Orientalium ecclesiarum - Fifty Years Later" featuring presentations by Brian E. Daley, John H. Erickson, Bishop Nicholas Samra, Thomas Bird, Roman Zaviyskyy, Bishop David Motiuk, Jaroslav Skira, Andriy Chirovsky, Peter Galadza and many other speakers. The conference was held at the University of Toronto (17–18 October 2014).

In November 2014, the institute organized "Religion in the Ukrainian Public Square: An Analysis of the Euromaidan and Its Aftermath" featuring presentations by Cyril Hovorun, Igor Shchupak, George Weigel, Victor Ostapchuk and others.

Guest lecturers and speakers at the institute have included the renowned Greek Orthodox Theologian Dr. Kyriaki Karidoyanes Fitzgerald, James Payton, Michael Jackson Bonner, Daniel Galadza, Msgr. A. Robert Nusca, Ephraim Radner, Frank Sysyn, Alexander Roman, Fr Geoffrey Ready, Ronald Graner and Victor Malarek. Subject topics and lectures have included Rome & the Christians of Persia, Liturgy and Byzantinization in Jerusalem, Newly Canonized & Newly Discovered Saints of the Kyivan Church, Church Singing in the Kyivan Churches in the Era of Metropolitan Andrey Sheptytsky (1865-1944), Toward an Orthodox Approach to the History of Christian Doctrine, Sasanian Persia, and Liturgical Theology after Schmemann: An Orthodox Reading of Paul Ricoeur.

In October 2018, the Institute organized a panel on the controversial 2018 tomos of autocephaly by the Ecumenical Patriarchate to the Church of Kyiv.

Faculty have been interviewed by CNN, the Catholic News Agency, Voskresinnya (Ukraine), and have appeared at the “Ukraine-Russia Conflict: The Religious Dimension” sponsored by the United States Institute of Peace, The Religious Freedom Institute and George Washington University.

== Directors ==
- Andriy Chirovsky (1986–2002), Founding Director
- Andrew Onuferko (2002–2006), Acting Director
- Stephen Wojcichowsky (2007–2013), Director
- Alexander Laschuk (2013–2014), Interim Director
- Peter Galadza (2014–2017) Acting Director, (2017–2020) Director
- Alexander Laschuk (2020–2026), Interim Executive Director
- Andrew Summerson (2026-present), Director

== See also ==
- Venerable Metropolitan Andrey Sheptytsky, O.S.B.M., Metropolitan Galicia, Archbishop of Lviv (Lemberg)
- Catholic Theological Union in Chicago, United States
- Ukrainian Catholic University in Lviv, Ukraine
- Pontifical Oriental Institute in Rome, Italy
- Kyivan Church Study Group
- Archimandrite Boniface Luykx
