= Eastern Catholic liturgy =

Forms of worship among Eastern Catholics

The Eastern Catholic Churches of the Catholic Church utilize liturgies originating in Eastern Christianity, distinguishing them from the majority of Catholic liturgies which are celebrated according to the Latin liturgical rites of the Latin Church. While some of these sui iuris churches use the same liturgical ritual families as other Eastern Catholic churches and Eastern churches not in full communion with Rome, each church retains the right to institute its own canonical norms, liturgical books, and practices for the ritual celebration of the Eucharist, other sacraments, and canonical hours.

Historically, tension between Latin Catholics and those worshipping with Eastern liturgies resulted in the latinization, restriction, or prohibition of Eastern liturgies within the Catholic Church. Since the early 20th century, popes have encouraged the usage of traditional liturgies among Eastern Catholics and delatinization. Further emphasis on Eastern Catholic liturgical practice was made during the Second Vatican Council with the publication of the 1964 Orientalium Ecclesiarum.

== Terminology ==
While the Eastern Catholic Churches are autonomous particular churches that practice multiple liturgical rites, they have been collectively addressed as "Eastern-rite Churches" to distinguish themselves from the Latin Church and its Latin liturgical rites. The term "rite" has also been used to mean sui iuris particular churches; the Second Vatican Council's 1964 decrees Orientalium Ecclesiarum specified that, within Catholic contexts, "rite" addresses the particular "liturgy, ecclesiastical discipline and spiritual heritage" of a given group of Christians. Increasingly, the term "rite" has been considered more appropriate only when discussing liturgical ritual families or the ritual celebration of the Eucharist, other sacraments, and canonical hours.

Some liturgical rites used by Eastern Catholics possess multiple names, both within the same church or to distinguish use of the same rite by different churches. For example, in the context of the Melkite Greek Catholic Church, the Byzantine Rite has also been called the "Greek Rite" while Melkite worship according to this rite has also been called the "Melkite Rite". Additionally, the specific version of the Byzantine Rite used by Melkites might be referred to as the Melkite "recension" of that rite; the term "use" is also applied to this concept among other Eastern Catholics such as the Maronite Church's permutation of the West Syriac Rite.

== History ==
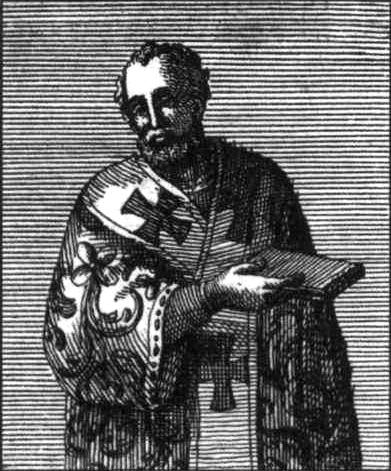
Michael Rohoza, proponent of union between Eastern Orthodox Christians and Catholics

The Byzantine Rite was regularly practiced in territories adjacent to traditionally Latin liturgical regions in the southern Italian Peninsula and Sicily through the first millennium, the result of hellenized monasteries and political divisions. This lineage of Byzantine ritual practice within Latin dioceses survived in Reggio Calabria until the early 18th century, but was gradually absorbed following an influx of Albanian immigrants in the 15th century; this later lineage forms the historic basis of the Italo-Albanian Catholic Church.

Michael Rohoza, the Metropolitan of Kiev and all Rus', spent the latter years of the 16th century pushing for union between the Eastern Orthodox Church and Rome on the terms of the Council of Florence. The Union of Brest in 1595-1596 was an agreement among Ruthenian members of the Eastern Orthodox Church to break with Constantinople and enter into full communion with the pope and Catholic Church. The union, both political and religious in nature, saw a list of 35 concessions written by Eastern Orthodox eparchs that would preserve their Byzantine liturgical practices. The accepted terms, particularly with regard to retaining Byzantine liturgy and not requiring the Filioque within the Nicene Creed, were assessed as "remarkably liberal" by historian Walter Frederic Adeney. The Ruthenian Uniate Church would be among the bodies formed from those who became Catholic under this union and it evolved into Ukrainian Greek Catholic Church, the largest Eastern Catholic Church.

Other Eastern Catholics saw their liturgies largely treated with suspicion from the Latin Church and the broad introduction of Liturgical Latinization, wherein Latin practices were added to or replaced native ritual. Among these were the Maronites of the Levant and the Syrian Christians of the Malabar Coast of India that eventually became the Syro-Malabar Catholic Church. The latter group resisted Latin impositions, resulting in significant schism.

In 1964 at the Second Vatican Council, the decree Orientalium Ecclesiarum was issued. This document sought to improve unity both between Latin and Eastern Catholics and between the Catholic Church and the Eastern Christian churches while placing a renewed emphasis on the distinctive elements of each tradition. These elements included not only liturgy but also canon law and autonomous administration. Scholarship on Eastern Catholic spirituality and liturgy benefited from the decree, resulting in some Eastern Catholics "rediscovering their own distinctive liturgical vestments and actions." Orientalium Ecclesiarum also sought to undo "mutilations" accrued within Eastern Catholic liturgies through latinization and ethnic interests; Boniface Luykx appraised these efforts as incomplete 30 years after the council. The process of reviving Eastern Catholic patrimony was bolstered by the post-conciliar Code of Canons for the Eastern Churches–containing the revised Eastern Catholic canon law–and the 1996 Instruction for Applying the Liturgical Prescriptions of the Code of Canons of the Eastern Churches–which provided guidance on further implementing objectives described in Orientalium Ecclesiarum.

=== Latinization and de-latinization ===
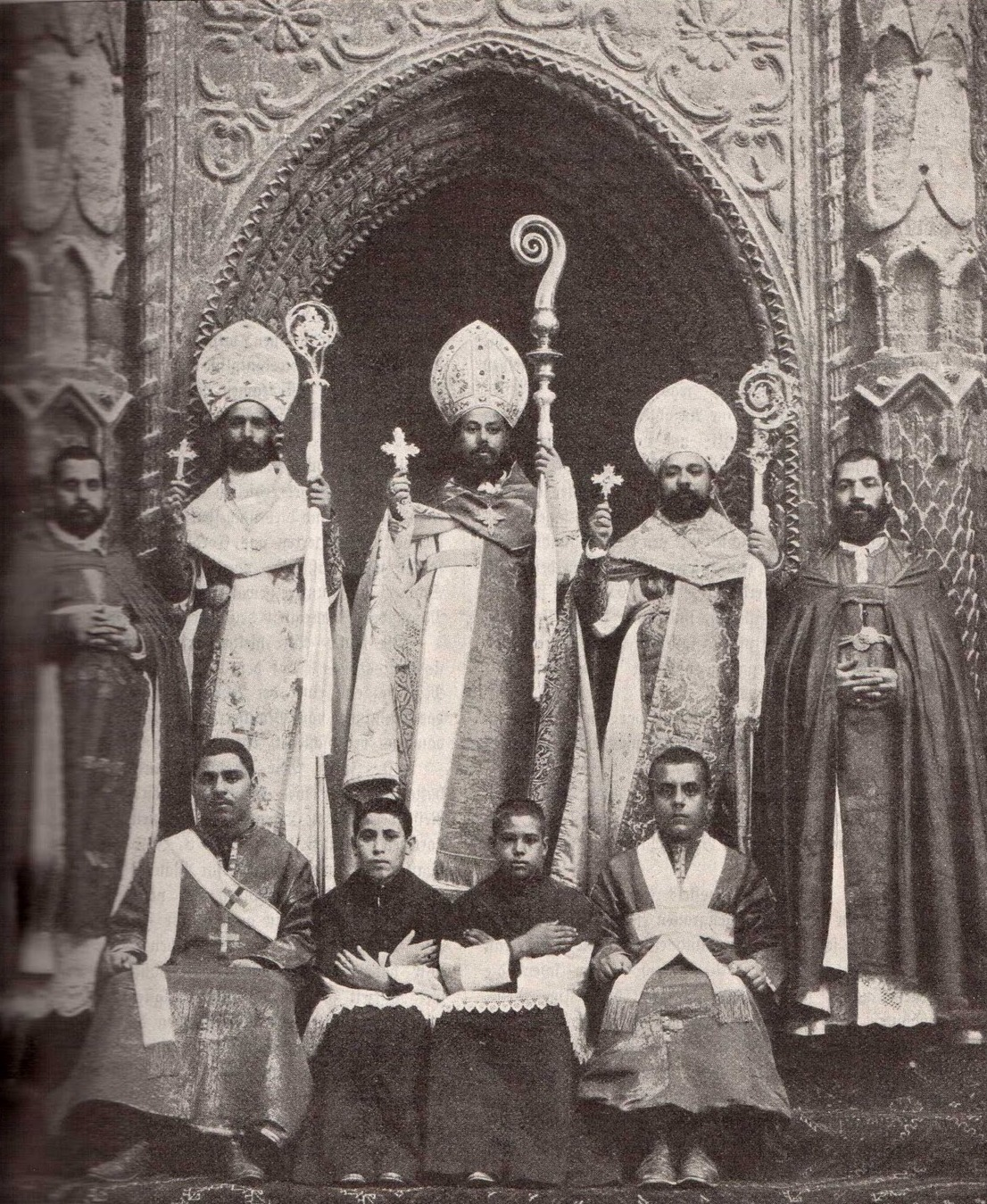
Coptic Catholic clergy and altar servers wearing Latin mitres and surplices in Egypt, 1900

"Latinization" was a general name applied to efforts to modify Eastern Catholic practices with "the spirit, practices and priorities of Latin liturgy and theology." These processes were sometimes imposed by Latin authorities upon Eastern Catholics, though it was not uncommon for some Eastern Catholics to self-latinize.

Despite long-standing claims from members of the Maronite Church, communion between Rome and Maronites was inconsistent from their origins by the 6th century until the 12th century. Following the stabilization of communion, the West Syriac liturgies of the Maronite Church were gradually modified to match Roman Rite liturgies and norms. For instance, the practice of communicating infants was prohibited by Pope Benedict XIV. The Maronite liturgies as they existed in the early 20th century were considered "disfigured" by this latinization and were distinguished from other Eastern Catholic liturgies by the significant adaptation to Roman Rite forms.

The arrival of the Portuguese on the Malabar Coast saw efforts to integrate the indigenous Saint Thomas Christians into the Latin Padroado ecclesiastical structure. The 1599 Synod of Diamper was the result of the Padroado efforts, bolstered by Jesuit missionaries. The synod prohibited native East Syriac Rite practices–these practices likely closely related to those of the Apostolic Assyrians–and subordinated Saint Thomas Christians to Latin ordinaries. Resentment towards this arrangement spurred the 1653 Coonan Cross Oath and the establishment of the Malankara Church.

While some Saint Thomas Christians remained in communion with Rome or returned shortly after the 1653 oath, others joined the Malankara Church that has itself divided into several churches, some influenced or in communion with the Syriac Orthodox Church. Late 19th-century efforts by Syro-Malabar Catholics to achieve greater ecclesial and liturgical autonomy failed to subordinate them to the Chaldean Catholic Church but resulted in the creation of a papal commission in 1934 to create a de-latinized pontifical. This process of de-latinization has continued progressively with opposition from a significant proportion of the Syro-Malabar; the debate continues to divide the church. Also in the 20th-century, the creation of the Syro-Malankara Catholic Church for Saint Thomas Christians converts from the Malankara Orthodox Syrian Church–previously in communion with the Syriac Orthodox–that used the Malankara Rite version of the West Syriac Rite saw efforts to address latinization within that church, sometimes leading to increased rifts between them and the Latin Catholics in India.

At the 1720 Synod of Zamość, the Ruthenian Uniate Church unilaterally authorized "latinizing" modifications to their Divine Liturgy to emphasize unity with Latin Catholics. These alterations included the insertion of the Filioque into the creed and a commemoration of the pope in the Ektene. Russian Orthodox commentators would harshly criticize the move, while later Catholic criticism would point to the unmodified Byzantine liturgies of the Melkite, Italo-Albanian, and Romanian Greek Catholics as evidence that the 1720 revisions were unnecessary. The synod's Latinizations have also been contrasted with the guidance described within Orientalium Ecclesiarum. Latinization of the Byzantine Rite continued in the successive centuries in both Europe and the United States due to influence from the Latin Church. For the Ukrainian Greek Catholic Church in the United States, Latinization was slowed during the 20th century by the arrival of educated native clergy and increased independence, particularly following the increased repression of the Ukrainian Greek Catholic Church in the Soviet Union in 1945–1946. These de-latinization trends continued in the 50 years following the Second Vatican Council.

A form of the Anaphora of Addai and Mari, an East Syriac anaphora, was adapted for use by Eastern Catholics. The anaphora has traditionally lacked explicit Words of Institution–"Take and eat; this is my body...Take and drink: this is my blood...Do this in memory of me"–which the Catholic Church has long held as necessary for the consecration of the Eucharist; an explicit narrative of consecration was introduced to the Catholic version of the anaphora. The matter became an ecumenical barrier between the Assyrian Church of the East and the Chaldean Catholic Church. Ultimately, the Pontifical Council for Promoting Christian Unity issued a statement that the unmodified Anaphora of Addai and Mari without the institution narrative implicitly consecrates the Eucharist. This allowed the Congregation for the Doctrine of the Faith to formally approve reciprocal admission to the Eucharist between Chaldean Catholics and Assyrians in 2001. The decision was met with criticism by some traditionalist Latin theologians and church officials. Chaldean Eucharistic liturgies—such as that celebrated by Pope Francis during his 2021 visit to Iraq—are still celebrated with the Words of Institution and the 2001 document encourages clergy of the Assyrian Church of the East to include them when Chaldeans are in attendance.

== Practice ==
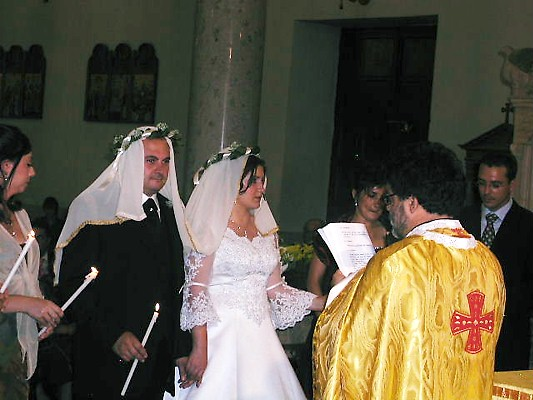
A couple marrying according to the Mystery of Crowning at a Byzantine Rite Catholic wedding

While Eastern Catholic liturgies vary, the rituals celebrated generally have corresponding liturgies in the Latin liturgical rites and the other Eastern rites. For example, the Eucharistic celebration of the Mass in the Latin rites is analogous to the Divine Liturgy of the Byzantine and Alexandrian liturgical rites, the Holy Qurbono of the West Syriac Rite, the Holy Qurbana of the Eastern Syriac Rite, and the Eucharistic celebrations of the Armenian Rite. Just as there exist Latin canonical hours according to texts including the Roman Breviary and Liturgy of the Hours, so too are there forms in each form of Eastern Catholic liturgy. These and other rituals are typically contained within authorized liturgical books.

The celebration of a specific Catholic sacramental liturgy is only permitted by those clergy canonically approved to utilize the form. As such, only clergy of a particular church that uses a rite may celebrate according to that rite, with exceptions among priests with bi-ritual faculties, who have received canonical approval to celebrate according to multiple forms. Both Latin and Eastern Catholic clergy can possess bi-ritual faculties; before it was normative for Latin Church liturgies to be in the vernacular, bi-ritual Latin clergy including Bishop Fulton J. Sheen would celebrate Eastern Catholic liturgies in the vernacular. Attendance and reception of the Eucharist is permitted among all Catholics at all Catholic liturgies, regardless of which particular church a person is canonically a member of; attendance of an Eastern Catholic Eucharistic liturgy fulfills the Latin Sunday obligation.

=== Alexandrian Rite ===
Descending from the Liturgy of Saint Mark, the Alexandrian Rite has been influenced by multiple other rites, particularly Byzantine ritual. Alexandrian liturgical rites are used by the Coptic Catholic Church (which practices according to the Coptic Rite), Ethiopian Catholic Church, and Eritrean Catholic Church; the latter was separated from the Ethiopian Catholic Church in 2015. While Coptic–a linguistic descendant of Ancient Egyptian–was long used in Coptic liturgies, Arabic replaced it in common practice by the early 20th century; in 1906, Coptic Catholics celebrating the canonical hours according to the Agpeya would do so officially in Arabic. Ethiopian liturgies utilized Ge'ez as a liturgical language and are subsequently sometimes known as the Ge'ez Rite.

The present Catholic Eucharistic liturgies in the Alexandrian rites contain little of the original Liturgy of Saint Mark, with the exception of an anaphora composed by Cyril of Alexandria in the Coptic Rite. Liturgies attributed to Basil of Caesarea and Gregory Nazianzus are also used. Within the Ethiopian Catholic Church, Cyril's anaphora is the most common and also known as the Liturgy of the Twelve Apostles; Ethiopian Catholics worship according to 14 anaphoras. The Ethiopian Catholic Church also celebrates some liturgies according to Latin practice; the near complete latinization of the Pontifical Ethiopian College was a point of division between Ethiopian Catholics and Rome. Catholic Ge'ez Rite altar vessels were similarly latinized and a hybridized scheme developed for using unleavened bread at the equivalent of a Low Mass while having leavened bread at the equivalent of a Solemn Mass; in Eritrea, it was universal custom to use unleavened bread as in Latin practice. Unique to the Catholic Ge'ez Eucharistic liturgy is the recitation of a modified form of the Hail Mary.

Among the Coptic Catholics, the Agpeya (also transliterated al-Agbieh) is composed of seven hours, with an extra evening office "of the Veil" (as-Satar) for clergy. Night prayer is composed of three nocturns with twelve psalms and a gospel apiece, with each followed by troparia, prayers, and the creed. With the exception of the dawn hour al-Baker with its 19 psalms, the other hours are each twelve psalms. The Ge'ez Catholic Divine Office is almost entirely composed of psalms with short poems. There is also a Ge'ez Marian office.

During the early 20th century, Ethiopian Catholics utilized Ge'ez translations of the Roman Ritual and Roman Pontifical. Marriage among the Coptic Catholics remained a crowning ceremony while the Ethiopians adopted the Roman Rite's practice. Infant baptism among Coptic Catholics is a lengthy rite featuring the anointment of the child with the oil of catechumens and followed immediately by the infant being confirmed. Ordination rites among Coptic Catholics vary between minor orders and those for deacons, priests, and bishops; diaconal and presbyterial candidates receive two impositions of the ordaining bishop's right hand on their head while episcopal ordinands receive impositions twice on their shoulders and forearms followed by the ordaining bishop breathing on their face.

=== Armenian Rite ===
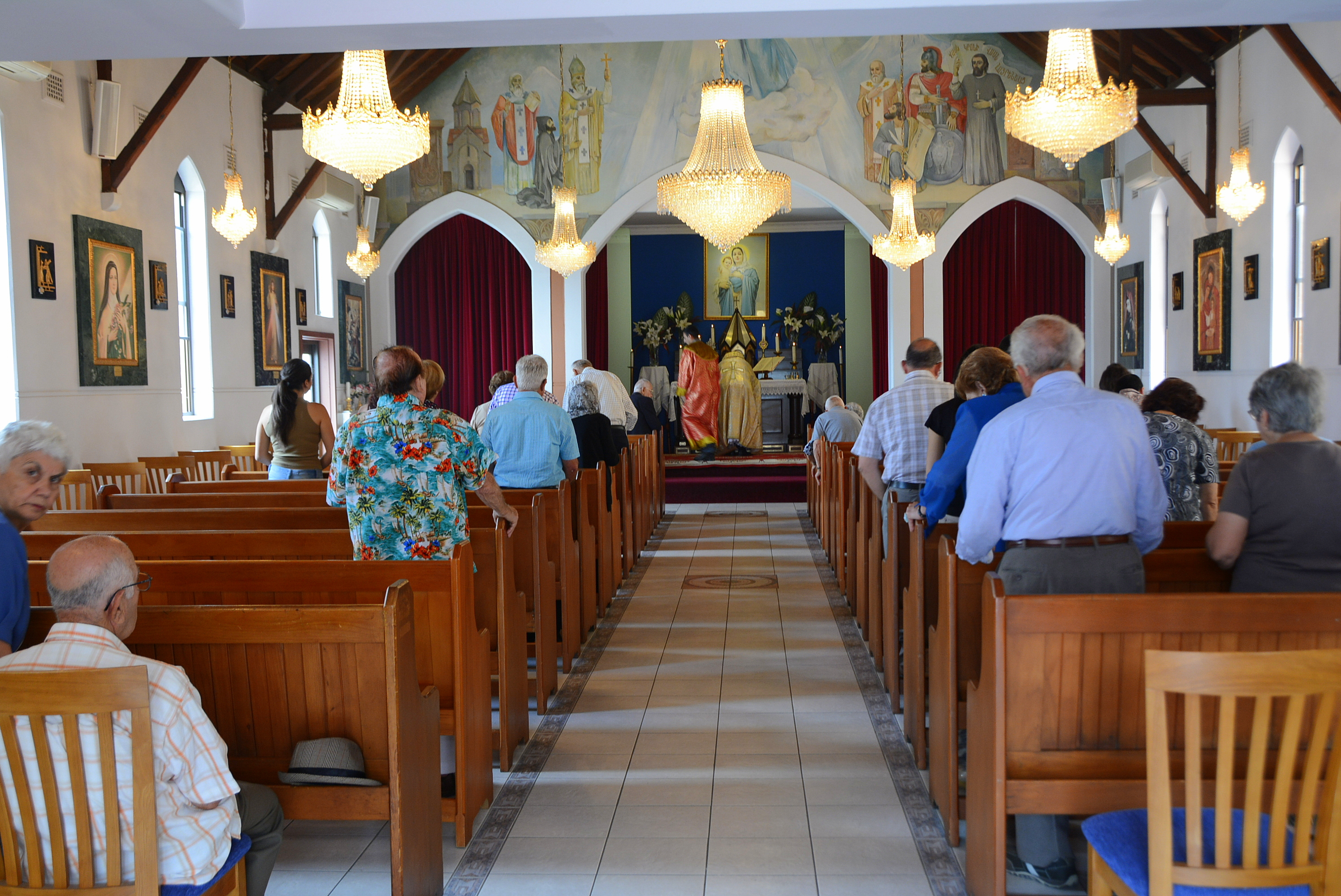
Armenian Catholic liturgy in Sydney, 2015

The only Eastern Catholics who worship according to the Armenian Rite, the Armenian Catholic Church, celebrate in its traditional liturgical language, Classical Armenian. It is a development of the originally Greek Liturgy of Saint Basil with attributes modified along Antiochene lines. Other modifications unique to the Armenian Rite as used by Eastern Catholics can be traced to Latin influence during the Crusades. Some long-standing communities of Armenian Catholics in Europe have unique ritual practices divorced entirely from the Armenian Rite in everything but language.

The Armenian Catholic Divine Office is divided into nine hours. Each of these hours are associated with a particular devotion, including to the three Persons of the Trinity, and are composed primarily of psalms, variable hymns known as kanons, and other prayers. The psalms are divided into seven groups for each day of the week. Some of the kanons are attributed to Nerses IV the Gracious while some of the prayers are attributed to John Mantaguni. Mantaguni is credited with assembling much of the Armenian Catholic Divine Office. Recitation of the Divine Office has been required among Armenian Catholic clergy since 1911.

The Eucharistic liturgy was traditionally celebrated in a quiet, almost inaudible voice while the choir or people sing, only ending his prayers aloud. Armenian Catholics only worship with a single anaphora. The liturgy begins with the celebrant washing his hands while reciting Psalm 25. The hymns sung by the choir and people follow the season or feast; the calendar only contains seven fixed-date feasts with the remainder falling on a Sunday.

Formal celebration of Extreme Unction was a long celebration that required the presence of seven priests, but this full service fell into disuse in the non-Catholic Armenian Apostolic Church by the 14th century. For practicality, Armenian Catholics had by the 20th century adopted the Roman Ritual's formula of administering unction. As in other Eastern liturgical rites, marriage involves a crowning ceremony.

=== Byzantine Rite ===
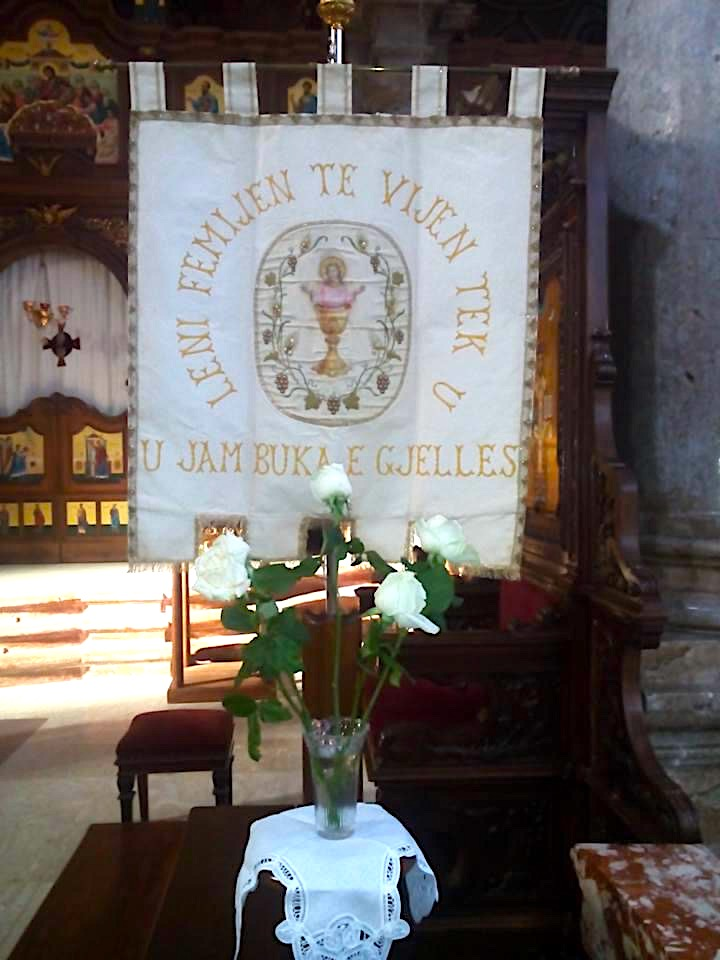
An Italo-Albanian church arranged for the first confession of children

Most Eastern Catholics worship according to the Byzantine Rite, with many of the sui iuris churches utilizing it. While sharing some elements with the Latin rites, the Byzantine Rite developed around the use of Greek, the vernacular of those who worshiped according to that rite, as opposed to the former's use of Latin, an "unknown tongue" among many Western worshippers. This use of the vernacular extended to other languages over the centuries, but Greek continued to be used in occasional solemn liturgies even among those who did not regularly speak it. As in the Eastern Orthodox Church, the Byzantine Rite as used by Eastern Catholics developed first out of the Liturgy of Saint James, a rite developed in Jerusalem and Antioch, which was later modified into the Liturgies of Saint John Chrysostom and Saint Basil.

At the Eucharistic liturgy, known as the Divine Liturgy, the reception of Communion differs from Latin practice, in which it was traditional to receive only the Body directly on an extended tongue. Byzantine practice typically dictates that celebrant hold the chalice's veil is held under the communicant's chin and both the Eucharistic elements–the Body having been immersed with a liturgical knife known as a spear into the Blood–are administered with a liturgical spoon into the communicant's mouth. The Liturgy of Saint John Chrysostom and Liturgy of Saint Basil have similar prayers and patterns for attendees, but the Liturgy of Saint Basil features longer prayers recited quietly by the celebrant. The Divine Liturgy is not celebrated on "strict fast days", such as those during Great Lent before Pascha. A solemn evening service, the Liturgy of the Presanctified Gifts, is celebrated during these days. The Liturgy of the Presanctified Gifts does not feature any consecration but rather Vespers followed by a distribution of previously consecrated Communion.

The Catholic Byzantine Rite contains nine standard canonical hours, with these offices sometimes being referred to collectively as the "Divine Praises". The offices are contained within a liturgical book known as the Horologion. Vespers and Matins were the typical public daily liturgies prior to Latinizations–which reached their zenith among some Byzantine Rite Catholics in the 1950s–that supplanted them with daily Divine Liturgies; the Second Vatican Council would push against this trend and sought to restore regular practice of the canonical hours. This restoration of the canonical hours continued with the 1996 Instruction for Applying the Liturgical Prescriptions of the Code of Canons of the Eastern Churches. Within Catholic Greek monastic communities and Russian ("Muscovite") parishes, the all-night vigil combines the pre-Divine Liturgy offices of a feast day into a single service. This practice is extant but not normative within the Ruthenian Recension.

Byzantine music is considered a culturally valuable component of the Catholic Byzantine Rite particularly with the growing number of choral compositions during the last two centuries. Among the most significant Byzantine Catholic musical traditions are those of the Ruthenians and Ukrainians, with the Greek Catholic Church of Croatia and Serbia's tradition sharing much with the latter. Within the several Byzantine liturgical music traditions, differences in rhythm–particularly between those who celebrate in Greek and those who celebrate in Slavonic–are distinguishing.

=== East Syriac Rite ===
The East Syriac Rite is used by Chaldean and Syro-Malabar Catholics. Sometimes called the Chaldean Rite, it is a development of Antiochene practice and was traditionally celebrated in the Syriac language. The liturgy as used by the Chaldeans developed out of Edessa (now Urfa) and is almost entirely in Syriac; the Scriptural lessons and other minor elements are said in the vernacular. Traditional Chaldean Catholic architecture places the sanctuary and altar behind a solid wall with three doors that can be obscured by curtains. Traditional Syro-Malabar liturgical architecture is similarly distinctive, but most other elements were for a long time latinized.

The Eucharistic liturgies of the Chaldean and Syro-Malabar Catholics, while still both of the East Syriac Rite, accrued significant Latin elements prior to the 20th century; significant portions of the Chaldean anaphora were directly taken from the Roman Canon as a historic "hallowing" had been lost. A single anaphora, the Liturgy of Addai and Mari, was long used by the Syro-Malabar Catholics. Since Vatican II, some Syro-Malabars have introduced the versus populum stance of the celebrant that had been widely adopted within the Roman Rite's Ordinary Form, as opposed to the traditional ad orientem, resulting in discord within the sui iuris church and appeals to the Vatican.

Chaldean Catholics have three canonical hours: Ramsha (equivalent to Vespers), Lilya (a night office), and Sapra (equivalent to Matins). The entire Psalter is recited over the week alongside hymns and prayers–many authored by Ephrem the Syrian–with the Gloria in excelsis Deo sung at Sapra on Sundays and feasts. The office is sung in the churchyard rather than within the church from Ascension Day to November.

=== West Syriac Rite ===
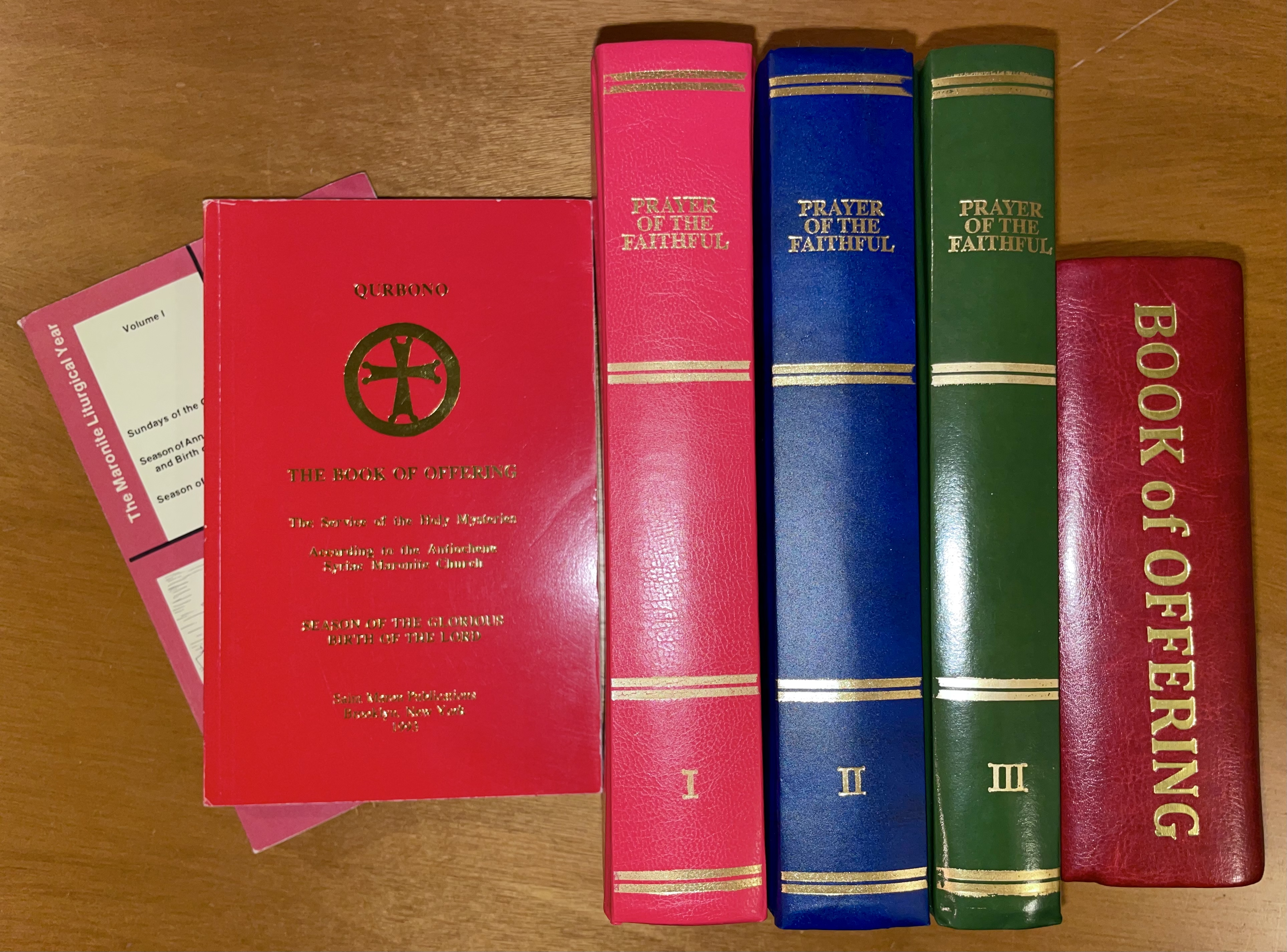
English-language Maronite liturgical books

West Syriac liturgies descend from the Liturgy of Saint James and are in use by the Maronite Church, Syriac Catholic Church, and Syro-Malankara Catholic Church. It also influenced the Byzantine, East Syriac, and Armenian ritual families. The Syriac Catholic Church has historically utilized seven anaphoras and the Maronite Church has used eight, the latter including a newer common form based on the Roman Canon. These liturgies have traditionally been celebrated in the Syriac language. The Syro-Malankara use of the West Syriac Rite, known as the Malankara Rite, has been understood as a less modified form of the rite relative to those liturgies of Syriac Catholics and Maronites; Eucharistic adoration in the form of exposition and benediction alongside the Stations of the Cross had been introduced by the late 1930s.

The Syriac Catholic Church traditionally did not practice concelebration at their Eucharistic liturgies–though on Maundy Thursday several concurrent liturgies could be celebrated on a shared improvised altar–and only celebrated their form of the Liturgy of the Presanctified Gifts on Good Friday. During a standard liturgy, it was typical for the priest to enter the sanctuary unvested to say preparatory prayers before drawing a curtain, vesting in the sacristy, and withdrawing the curtain. The priestly sign of peace has been described as similar to the Roman or fascist salute in appearance. The Divine Office–divided into seven hours–is largely composed of poetry and hymns, with some hours featuring no Psalms. Baptism and confirmation are celebrated in the same liturgy; marriage is divided across a rite for blessing the rings followed by the Mystery of Crowning.

The Maronite Church–like that of the Italo-Albanian Byzantines–uses an Eastern Catholic liturgy without direct non-Catholic analogue. Maronite liturgy and most vestments were heavily influenced by Roman practices, though post-Vatican II efforts removed some of these accretions. The Maronite Eucharistic liturgy is known as the Qurbono or Qorbono in Syriac, Quddas in Arabic, and the Holy Mystery of Offering in English. Nasrallah Boutros Sfeir, a Maronite Patriarch of Antioch, described the Maronite Qurbono as "marked by simplicity, clarity and active participation by the congregation." Among the few anaphoras included in early printings of the Qurbono in Rome between 1592 and 1594 was the "Sharrar" attributed to Saint Peter; this was deleted in subsequent more latinized printings. Until at least the late 17th century, it was standard for the Maronite Divine Office (Syriac: Shehimto) to be publicly said at monasteries with participation of the lay public; later Latinizations spurred by the Maronite College in Rome and changes in lifestyle saw the Divine Office become an increasingly private practice. Some efforts to incorporate more public celebrations of the offices were made in the 20th century. The festal propers for both the Qurbono and Shehimto are contained within the Fenqitho; prayers present in the Qurbono are introduced in the morning prayer of Safro.

== Current rites ==
Extant
- Byzantine Rite
  - Melkite Recension
  - Ruthenian Recension
  - Slavonic Recension
  - Slovak Rite
- West Syriac Rite
  - Malankara Rite
  - Maronite Use
- East Syriac Rite
  - Chaldean Rite
  - Syro-Malabaric Rite
- Armenian Rite
- Alexandrian liturgical rites
  - Coptic Rite
  - Ge'ez Rite

== See also ==
- American Carpatho-Russian Orthodox Diocese, an Eastern Orthodox body originating due to liturgical Latinization
- The Courage to Be Ourselves, a 1970 exhortation on Eastern Catholic practice
- Demandatam, a 1743 apostolic constitution on the Latinization of Melkite Catholic liturgy
