= Joseph Malouf =

Lebanese Greek Catholic Archbishop

Rasheed Saleem "Joseph" Malouf (December 20, 1893 – March 5, 1968) was the Melkite Greek Catholic Archbishop of Baalbek, Lebanon. Born in Zabbougha, Lebanon, Malouf was ordained a Melkite priest on July 20, 1925. He was appointed bishop of the Eparchy of Baalbek on October 20, 1937, replacing Malitios Abou-Assaleh. "Joseph" was his priestly name. Malouf was consecrated bishop and installed in his episcopal see on October 26, 1937. He was elevated to archbishop on November 18, 1964. Malouf died in 1968 and was succeeded as archbishop by Elias Zoghby.
