= Divination (disambiguation) =

Divination is the attempt to gain insight into a question or situation by way of an occultic ritual or practice.

Divination may also refer to:

- Divination (album), a 2012 album by In Hearts Wake
- "Bu Ju", a classical Chinese poem
- "Divination", an episode of the television series QI
- "Divinations", a song by Mastodon from the 2009 album Crack the Skye

== See also ==
- Divinization (disambiguation)
