= Cyril Korolevsky =

French priest and historian (1878–1959)

- Church: Catholic Church

Orders
- Ordination: 2 August 1902 by Cyril VIII Geha
- Rank: Priest

Personal details
- Born: Jean-François-Joseph Charon; December 16, 1878 Caen, France
- Died: April 19, 1959 (aged 80) Rome, Italy

Cyril Korolevsky (16 December 1878 – 19 April 1959), also known as Cyrille Korolevskij, born Jean-François-Joseph Charon, was a French Eastern Catholic priest, historian, and scholar of Eastern Christianity. A prominent advocate for the preservation of Eastern Christian liturgical traditions, he opposed the Latinization of the Eastern Catholic Churches and contributed to the development of Eastern Catholic canon law and liturgical reform.

== Life and work ==
Born in Caen, France, Korolevsky studied at the Saint-Sulpice Seminary before traveling to the Middle East. He entered the clergy of the Melkite Greek Catholic Church and was ordained a priest in Damascus in 1902. Initially known as Cyrille Charon, he subsequently developed an interest in Slavic Christianity and became associated with Metropolitan Andrey Sheptytsky of the Ukrainian Greek Catholic Church. In 1909, he transferred to Sheptytsky's ecclesiastical jurisdiction and adopted the surname Korolevsky.

Korolevsky spent much of his career in Rome, where he worked with the Congregation for the Eastern Churches on Eastern Catholic canon law, liturgical books, and ecclesiastical affairs. He also worked at the Vatican Library and contributed to the development of the liturgical traditions of several Eastern Catholic churches. His writings opposed the imposition of Latin customs on Eastern Christian communities and criticized Uniatism as a method of achieving Christian unity.

Korolevsky maintained a close scholarly relationship with Metropolitan Andrey Sheptytsky, who commissioned him to collect historical documents concerning the Ukrainian Church, particularly the work of Metropolitan Josaphat Kuntsevych's contemporary Joseph Velamin-Rutski. His research contributed to the publication of historical documents concerning the Order of Saint Basil the Great and to the development of the Monumenta Ucrainae Historica series. He also participated in preparing the monastic rule of the Studite Brethren.

Among his most influential works was L'Uniatisme (1927), an examination of the history and ecclesiological problems of Uniatism, and his biography of Metropolitan Sheptytsky, Métropolite André Szeptyckyj, 1865–1944, published posthumously in 1964. His writings on liturgical language advocated greater use of vernacular languages in Catholic worship.

Korolevsky's scholarship was subsequently translated and disseminated in English by Ukrainian Greek Catholic archimandrite Serge Keleher. Keleher translated and revised Korolevsky's biography of Sheptytsky, published as Metropolitan Andrew (1865–1944) in Lviv in 1993, and translated his essay on Uniatism, which was included in the same volume and subsequently published separately by Eastern Christian Publications in 2001.

Korolevsky died in Rome on 19 April 1959, aged 80. His autobiographical memoirs, Kniga Bytija moego (Le livre de ma vie), were published in two volumes in 2007, edited and annotated by historian Giuseppe Maria Croce.

== Selected works ==
- L'Uniatisme (1927).
- Métropolite André Szeptyckyj, 1865–1944 (1964; English translation, 1993).
- Liturgie en langue vivante: Orient et Occident (1955).
- Living Languages in Catholic Worship: An Historical Inquiry (1957).
- Kniga Bytija moego (Le livre de ma vie): Mémoires autobiographiques (2007; posthumous).
