= Zoghby Initiative =

The Zoghby Initiative was an ecumenical endeavour launched by Melkite Greek Catholic Church bishop Elias Zoghby whose goal was to allow inter-communion between the Melkites and the Antiochian Orthodox Church after a short period of dialogue.

== 1974 Melkite-Antiochian synods ==
Zoghby's ecumenical initiatives gained visibility in May 1974 with the exchange of visits between the Melkite Catholic and the Antiochian Orthodox synods, which met simultaneously in Lebanon. During the visit of the Melkite Catholic delegation to the Orthodox synod Zoghby drew attention to the fact that the original causes of separation between the groups had ceased to exist and the way was open for the "creation by stages of a real union between the two Churches, without waiting for the union of the Church of Rome and the Orthodox Churches." Afterwards the churches agreed to form separate commissions for dialogue.

== 1975 declaration ==
In 1975, Zoghby first suggested that the Melkite Catholic Church might enter communion with the Orthodox churches without ceasing to be in communion with Rome. After consideration, the Melkite Synod effectively shelved the proposal. The proposition, while admired, was considered too radical by the Melkite Catholic synod, whose members wished to proceed by more cautious dialogue, coupled with practical collaboration in community activities and pastoral work, prior to formal reunification. The idea then remained stalled during the chaos of the Lebanese Civil War, not to re-emerge among the Melkite Synod for another 20 years.

== Two-point Profession of Faith ==
In February 1995, Zoghby declared a two-point Profession of Faith:

1. I believe everything which Eastern Orthodoxy teaches.
2. I am in communion with the Bishop of Rome as the first among the bishops, according to the limits recognized by the Holy Fathers of the East during the first millennium, before the separation.

== July 1995 meeting ==
At the July 1995 meeting of the Melkite Synod, twenty-four of the twenty-six attending bishops present subscribed to the so-called "Zoghby Initiative". The document was then presented to the Melkite Patriarch, Maximos V, and the Greek Orthodox Patriarch of Antioch, Ignatius IV. The profession was accompanied by an endorsement by the Greek Orthodox Metropolitan of Biblos and Batroun, George Khodr, stating "I consider this profession by Kyr Elias Zoghby to fulfill the necessary and sufficient conditions to re-establish the unity of the Orthodox Churches with Rome." The proposal received much press, both positive and negative. Numerous ecumenists lauded the initiative, while some theologians and canonists were critical. Despite the mixed reception, the initiative helped create a new climate of dialogue on East–West reunification and communion. The proposal itself, however, was rejected outright by the Greek Orthodox Patriarchate of Antioch at a special Synod convened specifically to denounce the initiative.

== 1996 book ==
Zoghby asserted in his 1996 book Tous Schismatiques? (literally, "Are We All Schismatics?", usually translated "We Are All Schismatics") that the Church of Rome and the Orthodox Church share essentially the same faith. He declared that the Councils held by the West alone cannot be considered "ecumenical", criticized the Code of Canon Law of the Eastern Catholic Church, and said that the union which took place between some Eastern Churches and Rome was a mistake. Zoghby also asserted that the primacy of the Roman Pontiff is one of honor and charity only. Later, he said that papal "infallibility depends on ecumenicity."

== Support for double communion ==
Decrying the fissure between East and West, he said that "to prolong the schism is to remain in sin." Zoghby called for the Melkite Catholic Church to adopt "double communion" with both Rome and the Orthodox. Melkite Archbishop Cyril Salim Boustros, who succeeded Zoghby as eparch of Baalbek, said that while issues exist between the Eastern Catholic Churches and the Holy See, that "we could not conclude that our forefathers committed a mistake by proclaiming their union to Rome."

Zoghby called Tous Schismatiques? a "livre-choc" (literally, a shock-book), designed to stimulate discussion of the issue of his proposed communion. The book was dismissed by some in the Catholic Church as a very personal position with little merit; it was well received by other Catholics and Orthodox.

== Current status of the plan ==
So far, neither the Catholic Church nor the Orthodox Church has accepted the Zoghby initiative. Speaking for the Catholic Church, Cardinal Joseph Ratzinger (later Pope Benedict XVI) commented that "premature, unilateral initiatives are to be avoided, where the eventual results may not have been sufficiently considered." The Antiochian Orthodox Church was circumspect toward his initiative, declaring in October 1996 that "our Synod believes that inter-communion cannot be separated from the unity of faith. Moreover, inter-communion is the last step in the quest for unity and not the first."

However, certain Orthodox leaders praised Zoghby's candor and goals; Bishop Vsevolod Maidansky of the Ukrainian Orthodox Church of the USA, for example, wrote that Zoghby "invites us all to an ecumenical metanoia, a change in our hearts from the habit of seeking even more excuses to refrain from Eucharistic Communion." Although Zoghby's proposal of double communion has not been accepted by the Catholic Church or the Orthodox Church, the initiative focused greater attention on ecumenical discussions and renewed efforts for East–West unity.

On 7 April 2024, Patriarch Youssef Absi gave a speech at a book launching ceremony for the publication, سعي الى المصالحة الاخوية في انطاكيا, about the Zoghby Initiative. The following statements in the speech have been interpreted as a repudiation of or stepping back from the Zoghby Initiave:

أعتقد أنّ موضوع تموضعنا محسوم منذ أن استعدنا الوحدة مع كنيسة روما لكن لربّما لا نريد أن نجاهر به: نحن في العقيدة والقانون كاثوليكيّون وفي الليترجيّا والحياة الأسراريّة بيزنطيّون. أردنا، وبنيّة صافية، أن نكون جسرًا، لكنّا في الواقع وضعنا أرجلنا منذ البدء في الضفّة الغربيّة. (I believe that the issue of our position was settled from the time that we restored union with the Church of Rome, but perhaps we do not want to say it explicitly: in dogma and canon law, we are Catholics, and in liturgy and sacramental life we are Byzantines. We wanted, in all sincerity, to be a bridge, but in reality from the very beginning we planted our feet on the Western side.)

== See Also ==
- Kyivan Church Study Group — a similar, unofficial initiative between scholars, bishops, and theologians of the Ukrainian Greek Catholic Church and the Ecumenical Patriarchate.
