= Divinization =

Divinization may refer to:

- Apotheosis, the glorification of a subject to divine level
- Divinization (Christian), the transforming effect of divine grace, the spirit of God, or the atonement of Christ
- Theosis (Eastern Christian theology), a transformative process whose aim is likeness to or union with God

== See also ==
- Divination (disambiguation)
- Theosis (disambiguation)
