= Orientale Lumen =

1995 apostolic letter by Pope John Paul II on the Eastern Churches

- Coat of arms of Pope John Paul II
- Created: 2 May 1995
- Subject: Eastern Christianity, Eastern Catholic Churches, and Catholic–Orthodox relations
- Purpose: To commemorate the centenary of Orientalium dignitas and encourage appreciation of Eastern Christian traditions and Christian unity

Orientale Lumen (Latin for Light of the East) is an apostolic letter issued by Pope John Paul II on 2 May 1995, concerning the spiritual, theological, and liturgical traditions of Eastern Christianity and the pursuit of unity between the Catholic Church and the Eastern Orthodox Church. The letter was addressed to Catholic bishops, clergy, and faithful to commemorate the centenary of Orientalium dignitas, an apostolic letter promulgated by Pope Leo XIII in 1894.

The document calls upon Latin Catholics to become more familiar with the traditions of the Christian East, which John Paul II describes as an integral part of the heritage of the universal Church. It emphasizes the distinctive contributions of Eastern Christian theology, spirituality, liturgy, monasticism, and ecclesiology, while encouraging closer relations between Catholics and Orthodox Christians.

The letter also addresses the identity and responsibilities of the Eastern Catholic Churches, urging them to preserve their authentic traditions while seeking reconciliation with the Orthodox Churches from which they remain separated.

== Background ==
=== The centenary of Orientalium dignitas ===
Orientale Lumen was promulgated on the centenary of Pope Leo XIII's apostolic letter Orientalium dignitas, issued on 30 November 1894. Leo XIII's letter sought to protect the dignity, traditions, and ecclesiastical disciplines of the Eastern Catholic Churches.

John Paul II presented his own letter as a continuation of that concern, informed by a century of developments in Catholic–Eastern Christian relations.

The letter also drew upon the ecclesiological and ecumenical teachings of the Second Vatican Council, particularly the decree on the Eastern Catholic Churches, Orientalium Ecclesiarum, and the decree on ecumenism, Unitatis redintegratio.

=== Catholic–Orthodox relations ===
The letter was issued during a period of renewed Catholic–Orthodox dialogue following the Second Vatican Council and the political transformations of Eastern Europe.

John Paul II acknowledged tensions between Catholics and Orthodox Christians, including difficulties associated with the re-emergence of Eastern Catholic communities after decades of religious persecution under communist governments.

He called for greater mutual understanding, respect for the distinctive traditions of the Eastern Churches, and practical cooperation between Catholic and Orthodox communities.

== Contents ==
The apostolic letter consists of an introduction, two principal parts, and a conclusion, comprising 28 numbered paragraphs.

=== Introduction (1–4) ===
The letter begins by identifying Jesus Christ as the light that has come from the East and illuminated the universal Church.

John Paul II describes the Christian East as an indispensable part of the Church's spiritual and theological inheritance. He calls upon Catholics of the Latin tradition to become familiar with Eastern Christianity and to recognize its contribution to the fullness of the Church's catholicity.

The introduction also emphasizes Jerusalem as the historical starting point of Christianity and the shared origins of the Churches of East and West.

=== I. Knowing the Christian East (5–16) ===
The first major part of the letter surveys distinctive aspects of Eastern Christian spirituality and theology.

==== An experience of faith (5–6) ====
John Paul II describes the Eastern Christian understanding of salvation as participation in the divine life, particularly through the sacraments and the work of the Holy Spirit.

The letter discusses the theology of theosis or divinization, associated with the Church Fathers, particularly Irenaeus of Lyon and the Cappadocian Fathers. It presents the Eastern emphasis on participation in the life of the Trinity as an important contribution to Christian theology.

The document also discusses the Eastern understanding of divine mystery and the limitations of human language in describing God.

==== Gospel, Churches and culture (7) ====
The letter emphasizes the historical capacity of Eastern Christianity to express the Gospel through different languages and cultures.

John Paul II points to the missionary activity of Cyril and Methodius as an example of evangelization that respected the cultural identity of the peoples receiving Christianity.

He presents this tradition of inculturation as a model for the universal Church.

==== Between memory and expectation (8) ====
John Paul II discusses the importance of Sacred Tradition as a living transmission of Christian faith.

He describes tradition not merely as the repetition of inherited formulas but as the continuing life of the Church, preserved through apostolic succession, the witness of the saints, and the faith of successive generations.

==== Monasticism as a model of baptismal life (9–10) ====
The letter identifies Eastern Christian monasticism as a central expression of Eastern spirituality.

John Paul II describes monastic life as a model for all baptized Christians rather than a vocation entirely separated from ordinary Christian life.

He emphasizes the importance of prayer, asceticism, contemplation, hospitality, and service in the Eastern monastic tradition.

==== Between Word and Eucharist (11–12) ====
The document discusses the relationship between Scripture, liturgical worship, and the Eucharist in Eastern Christianity.

It presents the liturgy as an expression of the Church's participation in the mystery of salvation and emphasizes the role of worship in shaping Christian theology and spirituality.

==== A liturgy for all creation (13–14) ====
John Paul II explores the cosmic dimension of Eastern Christian worship.

He describes the liturgy as involving the whole created order and presents the sacramental life of the Church as a participation in the transformation of creation through Christ.

==== A clear vision for discovering oneself (15) ====
The letter discusses the Eastern Christian understanding of the human person, particularly the relationship between spiritual growth, repentance, and the recovery of humanity's likeness to God.

It connects Christian self-knowledge with the spiritual disciplines of the Eastern tradition.

==== A father in the Spirit (16) ====
John Paul II examines the role of spiritual guidance in Eastern Christianity, particularly the relationship between a spiritual father and those seeking direction in the Christian life.

The section emphasizes spiritual discernment, humility, and the transmission of religious experience.

=== II. From knowledge to encounter (17–27) ===
The second major part of the letter turns from the spiritual inheritance of Eastern Christianity to the practical pursuit of Christian unity.

==== The experience of unity (17–19) ====
John Paul II reflects on the development of ecumenical relations following the Second Vatican Council.

He emphasizes that the search for unity requires mutual knowledge, prayer, repentance, and an appreciation of the gifts preserved in different Christian traditions.

==== Historical developments and the Eastern Churches (20–21) ====
The letter reviews developments in the Catholic Church's relations with Eastern Christianity, including the establishment of institutions devoted to the Eastern Churches and the promulgation of the Code of Canons of the Eastern Churches in 1990.

John Paul II emphasizes that the Eastern Catholic Churches did not intend to abandon their traditions by entering into communion with Rome.

He states that their full communion with the Roman See must not diminish their authenticity or originality, and calls upon the Latin Church to respect and appreciate their distinctive heritage.

The letter also recognizes the continuing separation between Eastern Catholics and Orthodox Christians who share the same ecclesiastical and spiritual traditions.

==== Meeting one another, getting to know one another, working together (22–27) ====
John Paul II proposes practical measures to strengthen relations between Eastern and Western Christians.

These include greater knowledge of Eastern liturgical and theological traditions, academic exchanges, cooperation between Catholic and Orthodox institutions, common pilgrimages, and collaboration in charitable and pastoral activities.

The letter particularly encourages monasteries to serve as places of encounter between Christians of different traditions.

It also addresses the circumstances of Eastern Christian communities in the diaspora, encouraging cooperation between Eastern Catholic hierarchs and Latin bishops while preserving the distinctive identity of Eastern Christian communities.

=== Conclusion: Journeying together toward the Orientale Lumen (28) ===
The letter concludes with an appeal for the restoration of Christian unity.

John Paul II expresses regret that Catholics and Orthodox Christians remain unable to celebrate the Eucharist together and urges Christians of East and West to continue their journey toward reconciliation.

He concludes by presenting the Christian East as a sign of hope and by invoking the Virgin Mary as a guide toward the light of Christ.

== Major themes ==
=== Eastern Christian identity ===
A recurring theme of Orientale Lumen is the importance of preserving the distinctive theological, liturgical, spiritual, and canonical traditions of the Eastern Churches.

John Paul II argues that the universality of the Church is expressed through the diversity of authentic Christian traditions rather than through uniformity of practice.

The letter particularly emphasizes the responsibility of Eastern Catholics to maintain their own traditions and the responsibility of Latin Catholics to recognize their value.

=== Ecclesiology and Christian unity ===
The letter presents Catholic–Orthodox reconciliation as a task requiring more than institutional agreements.

John Paul II emphasizes the importance of shared faith, mutual conversion, respect for ecclesiastical traditions, and the recovery of the historical relationships between the Churches of East and West.

He also acknowledges that the division between Eastern Catholics and Orthodox Christians represents a continuing wound within communities that share much of the same spiritual inheritance.

=== Monasticism and spirituality ===
The letter gives particular attention to Eastern monasticism, which it presents as a major contribution to the spiritual life of the universal Church.

It encourages the renewal of Eastern monastic communities, including in the diaspora, and identifies monastic institutions as potential centers of ecumenical encounter.

== Legacy ==
Orientale Lumen contributed to continuing discussions of Eastern Christian spirituality, ecclesiology, and Catholic–Orthodox relations following the Second Vatican Council. Its emphasis on mutual understanding and the preservation of Eastern Christian traditions was reflected in subsequent ecumenical initiatives, including a series of conferences named after the apostolic letter.

=== Orientale Lumen Foundation ===
The Orientale Lumen Foundation is an ecumenical organization that promotes dialogue and understanding among Eastern Orthodox, Eastern Catholic, and Roman Catholic Christians. Its activities include conferences, pilgrimages, publications, and educational initiatives.

The foundation's annual Orientale Lumen conferences began in Washington, D.C., in 1997, two years after the promulgation of John Paul II's apostolic letter. The conferences bring together clergy, theologians, scholars, and laypeople to discuss Eastern Christian traditions and the prospects for Christian unity.

The conferences were established by Jack Figel, who explained in a 2018 interview that he adopted the title of the apostolic letter to draw greater attention to its contents. The initiative subsequently developed into a continuing series of ecumenical gatherings.

The conferences have included participants from both Catholic and Orthodox traditions. The second conference, held at the Catholic University of America in June 1998, examined Catholic–Orthodox relations and the development of papal teaching concerning the Eastern Churches.

== See also ==
- Orientalium dignitas
- Orientalium Ecclesiarum
- Unitatis redintegratio
- Ut unum sint
- Eastern Catholic Churches
- Catholic–Eastern Orthodox relations
- Eastern Christian monasticism
- Kyivan Church Study Group
