= Orientale Lumen Foundation =

American ecumenical organization promoting Catholic–Orthodox dialogue

The Orientale Lumen Foundation is an American ecumenical organization dedicated to promoting dialogue and understanding among Eastern Orthodox, Eastern Catholic, and Roman Catholic Christians. Founded by Byzantine Catholic layman Jack Figel, it organizes conferences, pilgrimages, and educational initiatives focused on Catholic–Eastern Orthodox relations and the traditions of Eastern Christianity.

== History ==
The foundation originated with the first Orientale Lumen conference, held in Washington, D.C., in June 1997. Its name derives from Orientale Lumen (Latin for "Light of the East"), the 1995 apostolic letter of Pope John Paul II encouraging greater appreciation of Eastern Christian traditions and renewed efforts toward Catholic–Orthodox unity.

Figel developed the conference concept in consultation with the Orthodox theologian Kallistos Ware in 1996. The first gathering was organized with the cooperation of the Catholic University of America.

In a 2018 interview, Figel explained that he had adopted the title of the apostolic letter because he believed it had received insufficient attention. The initial conference subsequently developed into a continuing series of ecumenical gatherings.

== Activities ==
The foundation sponsors the annual Orientale Lumen conferences, which bring together Catholic and Orthodox bishops, theologians, clergy, and laypeople for theological discussions, common prayer, and informal encounters. Topics have included ecclesiology, papal primacy, synodality, liturgy, and the restoration of communion between the Catholic and Orthodox churches.

The foundation also organizes ecumenical pilgrimages and distributes recordings of lectures, liturgical services, and conferences. It is associated with Eastern Christian Publications, a publisher specializing in Eastern Christian theology, spirituality, and history.

In July 2026, the foundation held its thirtieth conference in Washington, D.C., under the theme "Ecumenism at a Crossroad: Consensus Achieved – What's Next?" Participants included Cardinal Seán Patrick O'Malley, Archbishop Flavio Pace of the Dicastery for Promoting Christian Unity, and Metropolitan Tikhon (Mollard) of the Orthodox Church in America.

== See also ==
- Kyivan Church Study Group — the inspiration for the Orientale Lumen format
