= Elias Zoghby =

Melkite Greek Catholic Archbishop

His Excellency, The Most Reverend Elias Zoghby
- Archbishop of Baalbek
- Native name: إلياس زغبي
- Church: Melkite Greek Catholic
- See: Eparchate of Baalbek
- In office: 9 September 1968 – 24 October 1988
- Predecessor: Archbishop Joseph Malouf
- Successor: Archbishop Cyril Salim Bustros
- Previous post: Patriarchal Vicar for the See of Alexandria

Orders
- Ordination: 20 July 1936
- Consecration: 21 November 1954

Personal details
- Born: 9 January 1912 Cairo, Khedivate of Egypt
- Died: 16 January 2008 (aged 96) Beirut, Lebanon

Elias Zoghby (Arabic: إلياس زغبي; 9 January 1912 – 16 January 2008) was an Egyptian-born Lebanese Catholic prelate who served as Archbishop of Baalbek in the Melkite Greek Catholic Church from 1968 to 1988. He was known as a leading advocate of Catholic–Orthodox ecumenism. He is best known for his ecumenical interventions during the Second Vatican Council and for his 1995 Profession of Faith, known as the Zoghby Initiative, which attempted to re-establish communion between the Melkite Greek Catholic Church and the Eastern Orthodox Church.

Zoghby's views on topics such as Catholic–Orthodox "double communion" and dissolution of marriage were controversial. Critics labeled him the enfant terrible of his church, while supporters lauded him as an energetic visionary who sought to re-unite the Eastern Churches.

== Biography ==
=== Early life and ministry in Egypt ===
Elias Zoghby was born on 9 January 1912 in Cairo. His mother, Hanne Ishak Yared, was a Melkite Greek Catholic and his father, Abdallah Mikail Zoghby, was an Antiochian Orthodox convert and former Maronite Catholic. The couple had recently emigrated from Lebanon and settled in Cairo's Darb-el-Guenena neighborhood. The area had a Melkite church nearby which his parents attended. Elias and his siblings were baptized into the Melkite faith and raised in a devout household, attending liturgy daily, reading the bible together as a family and praying the Office every afternoon.

Zoghby related in Memoires that he first received a vocational call at age sixteen. With his parents' blessing he left for seminary in the summer of 1928, going to Jerusalem to study with the White Fathers at the Melkite seminary of Saint Anne. He was ordained a priest at Saint Anne Melkite Basilica in Jerusalem on 20 July 1936, following which he was appointed a professor of Arabic Literature and Mathematics at the seminary. He later returned to Cairo as a parish priest.

While in Egypt, Zoghby considered the issues of ecumenism and the schism between the Melkite Catholic and Antiochian Orthodox Churches. As he began to study both the historical roots of the separation and the modern divisions of Middle Eastern churches he came to the opinion that the schism was unjustifiable. He also began to question the domination of the so-called Uniate churches by the See of Rome. Zoghby, along with other Melkite priests in Egypt such as George Hakim and Joseph Tawil, were influenced by Father Oreste Karame, who advocated the need for the Melkite Church to return to its proper traditions and work for communion with the Orthodox Church.

In 1951 he was elevated to archimandrite while serving in Alexandria. While there he was threatened with arrest for preventing the execution of a sentence passed by a Sharia tribunal. On 27 August 1954 he was named auxiliary bishop of Antioch; then, on 2 September 1954, he was appointed Titular Archbishop of Nubia. Zoghby was formally consecrated bishop on 21 November 1954, when he was elevated to Patriarchal Vicar for the See of Alexandria, Cairo and the Sudan.

As the leader of the Melkite church in Egypt Zoghby was a vocal proponent of rights for Christians, and opposed the limitations placed on them by that country's Law of Personal Statutes. The Nasser regime imprisoned him on 20 December 1954, for his public opposition to the statutes. Released shortly afterwards, he continued to serve as patriarchal vicar in Egypt.

=== Vatican II and Baalbek ===
Zoghby was one of the most active eastern Catholic bishops to participate at the Second Vatican Council, where he offered eleven interventions. While some of the interventions were pastoral in nature, a good number were ecumenical, focusing on the Eastern churches and their relationship with Western Christianity. Zoghby's efforts helped shape the formation of Orientalium Ecclesiarum, although, to his disappointment, in his view it did not adequately address the needs of the Eastern Catholic Churches or bridge the gulf between Orthodoxy and Catholicism. Zoghby spoke in French during the Council discussions, reflecting his desire to avoid "Latinisation" in the wider church.

While Orientalium Ecclesiarum encouraged Eastern Catholics to uphold their traditions and values, Zoghby felt that it "turn[ed] a blind eye" to true intercommunion (communicatio in sacris).

Following the Council he opposed the ascension to the cardinalate of Melkite Patriarch Maximos IV Sayegh, stating that the leader of an Eastern Catholic church should not hold a subordinate Latin-rite office. In protest, Zohgby resigned his position as patriarchal vicar of Alexandria. Maximos IV died in 1967; his successor, Maximos V Hakim, was a friend of Zoghby's and a fellow Egyptian. In August 1968 the Melkite Synod elected Zoghby archbishop of Baalbek to replace the recently deceased eparch, Joseph Malouf. Installed as archbishop there on 9 September 1968, he led the small eparchy during the Lebanese Civil War. In 1982 he was kidnapped by pro-Iranian terrorists.

Zoghby retired on 24 October 1988, at age 76. He remained an active proponent of ecumenism following his retirement, urging the reunification of the Melkite Greek Catholic Church and the Antiochian Orthodox Church. He died on 16 January 2008 in Lebanon; his funeral was held on 19 January at St. Paul's Basilica in Harissa.

== Ecumenism and the Zoghby Initiative ==
Zoghby's ecumenical initiatives gained visibility in May 1974 with the exchange of visits between the Melkite Catholic and the Antiochian Orthodox synods, which met simultaneously in Lebanon.

During the visit of the Melkite Catholic delegation to the Orthodox synod Zoghby drew attention to the fact that the original causes of separation between the groups had ceased to exist and the way was open for the "creation by stages of a real union between the two Churches, without waiting for the union of the Church of Rome and the Orthodox Churches".

Afterwards, the churches agreed to form separate commissions for dialogue. Zogby outlined his views on the topic in his book Ecumenical Reflections, which was characterized by Vsevolod, the Orthodox Bishop of Scopelos, as an invitation "to ecumenical metanoia ... to recognize that where there is the fundamental common faith, held alike by Catholics and Orthodox, there is no defensible impediment to Eucharistic Communion."

== Views on dissolution of marriage ==
While attending Vatican II Zoghby spoke to the Council on 29 September 1965, about the trauma of the innocent spouse in cases of adultery. Zoghby suggested a solution which considers adultery and abandonment as causes for the dissolution of marriage:

"We know how much the Fathers of the Eastern Church tried to dissuade widowers and widows from a second marriage, thus following the Apostle's advice, but they have never wished to deprive the innocent spouse who has been unjustly abandoned of the right to remarry. This tradition, preserved in the East, and which was never reproved during the ten centuries of union, could be accepted again and adopted by Catholics. Progress in patristic studies has indeed brought to the fore the doctrine of the Eastern Fathers who were no less qualified exegetes or moralists than the Western ones."

The following month, Melkite Patriarch Maximos IV declared that, while "Archbishop Zoghby, like all Fathers of the council, enjoys full freedom to say what he thinks ... [Zoghby] speaks only for himself personally. With respect to the heart of the problem, the Church must hold fast to the indissolubility of marriage."

== Publications ==
- We Are All Schismatics (Tous Schismatiques?). ISBN 978-1-56125-019-6
- A Voice from the Byzantine East. ISBN 978-1-56125-018-9. This work of ecumenical theology and ecclesiology focuses on the role of the Eastern Catholic Churches in furthering the cause of Christian unity.
- Ecumenical Reflections. ISBN 978-1-892278-06-7. Translated by Bishop Nicholas Samra, 1998
- St. Mathiew, lu par un Eveque d'Orient. Two volumes
- Le Credo de l'Amour. Anthology of poetry
- Pour vivre notre foi. Anthology of poetry
- Memoires. Un Eveque peu commode, dit-on. Autobiographical reflections
- Une Experience de Vie en Christ.
- Quand la Tendresse divine se fait Mere.
- Orthodox Uni, oui! Uniate, non!. Reproduced in Eastern Churches Journal, 2:3 (1995)
