= Daniel Zelinsky =

Daniel Zelinsky may refer to:

- Daniel Zelinsky (mathematician) (1922–2015), American mathematician
- Daniel Zelinsky (bishop) (born 1972), American Ukrainian Orthodox bishop
