= Orientalium dignitas =

1894 encyclical of Pope Leo XIII

Orientalium dignitas Latin for 'The dignity of the Easterners' Encyclical of Pope Leo XIII
- Signature date: 30 November 1894; 131 years ago
- Subject: On the Churches of the East
- Number: 53 of 85 of the pontificate
- Text: In English

Orientalium dignitas is a papal encyclical concerning the Eastern Catholic Churches issued by Pope Leo XIII on 30 November 1894. The encyclical further established the rights of the Eastern Catholic Churches. This includes a prohibition against Latinizing influences among Eastern Catholics, encouragement of Eastern Catholics to remain true to their church traditions, and the expansion of the jurisdiction of the Melkite patriarch over the faithful of his rite to include the whole of the Ottoman Empire.

In the encyclical, Leo said "that the ancient Eastern rites are a witness to the Apostolicity of the Catholic Church, that their diversity, consistent with unity of the faith, is itself a witness to the unity of the Church, that they add to her dignity and honour. He says that the Catholic Church does not possess one rite only, but that she embraces all the ancient rites of Christendom; her unity consists not in a mechanical uniformity of all her parts, but on the contrary, in their variety, according in one principle and vivified by it."

== Content ==
Leo XIII chose to impose new rules to regulate the relationship between the Latin Church and the Eastern Churches:

- A Latin rite missionary who attempts to liturgically convert an Eastern faithful incurs Suspension a divinis as well as dismissal and exclusion from their office;
- If an Eastern patriarch lacks a priest of his own rite, he may entrust the task of celebrating the sacraments to a Latin priest who will use the formulas and customs of the Eastern rite. Believers have the opportunity to receive communion in any approved Catholic rite;
- Religious corporations dedicated to the education of youth, if they have a considerable number of students of the Eastern rite, must ensure that they can receive religious education in accordance with their own rite;
- Both Eastern and Latin priests may grant absolution only for cases granted by the Ordinary and solely to members belonging to their own rite;
- If approved by the Apostolic See, Eastern Catholics who have converted to the Latin rite may return to their original rite;
- A woman married to a man of a rite different from her own may freely change rites. If the marriage is declared null, the woman will be free to return to her original rite;
- An Eastern-rite faithful who finds themselves under Latin administration will maintain their own rite and pass under the jurisdiction of the patriarch as soon as they are in their canonical territory;
- Latin religious orders or institutes are prohibited from admitting members of the Eastern rite;
- A family entering into the unity of the Catholic Church, although obliged to embrace the Latin rite, will have the opportunity, if available, to change it by returning to their original rite;
- Matrimonial or ecclesiastical cases are entrusted exclusively to the Sacred Congregation of Propaganda;

== See also ==
- Eastern Catholic Churches
- List of encyclicals of Pope Leo XIII
- Orientalium Ecclesiarum
- Orientale Lumen — Pope John Paul II's 1995 apostolic letter marking the centenary of Orientalium dignitas.
