= Theosis =

Theosis may refer to:

- Divinization (Christian), the transforming effect of divine grace, the spirit of God, or the atonement of Christ
- Exaltation (Mormonism), a belief that after death some people will reach the highest level of salvation in the celestial kingdom and eternally live in God's presence, continue as families, become gods, create worlds, and make spirit children over whom they will govern
- Theosis (Eastern Christian theology), a transformative process whose aim is likeness to or union with God
- Theosis: The True Purpose of Human Life, a 1992 book by George Kapsanis

== See also ==
- Divinization (disambiguation)
