= Orientalium Ecclesiarum =

Decree on the Eastern Catholic Churches

Orientalium Ecclesiarum, the Decree on the Catholic Churches of the Eastern Rite, is one of the Second Vatican Council's 16 magisterial documents. "Orientalium Ecclesiarum" is Latin for "of the Eastern Churches", and is taken from the first line of the decree.

The decree recognizes the right of Eastern Catholics to keep their own distinct liturgical practices while remaining in full communion with the Holy See. The decree exhorts Eastern Catholics to "take steps to return to their ancestral traditions". This aspect of the decree was directed against Latinisation.

One of the shortest conciliar documents, it was approved on 20 November 1964 by a vote of 2,054 in favour and 64 opposed, and was confirmed by a vote of 2,110 to 39 on 21 November 1964, the day on which it was promulgated by Pope Paul VI alongside Lumen gentium, the Dogmatic Constitution on the Church, and the Council's decree Unitatis redintegratio, on Christian unity, and there is a "profound connection" between all three documents.

== Development ==
Some of the preliminary material used in drafting this decree came from a section relating to the topic of unity with Eastern Christians in an early draft of the Council's decree on ecumenism. Elias Zoghby, Eparch of Baalbek, made several contributions to the debate on the text.

== Contents ==
The document specifies some of the autonomous powers of the Eastern Churches. In particular, the Patriarch (or where applicable, major archbishop) and synod have the power to establish eparchies, to nominate bishops within their patriarchate, to legislate the rights and obligations of the minor orders (including subdiaconate), and to determine the date for celebrating Easter within their rite. It furthermore recognized the ancient practice in the East regarding the sacrament of confirmation (Chrismation), stating that all Eastern priests have the power to administer this sacrament using chrism blessed by a bishop. One of the implications of this is the further practice of infant communion was formally recognized.

There are 30 articles, divided into 6 chapters, plus a preamble and a conclusion.

=== Preamble ===
The Preamble affirms the Catholic Church's respect for Eastern Catholics (§1):

The Catholic Church holds in high esteem the institutions, liturgical rites, ecclesiastical traditions and the established standards of the Christian life of the Eastern Churches, for in them, distinguished as they are for their venerable antiquity, there remains conspicuous the tradition that has been handed down from the Apostles through the Fathers and that forms part of the divinely revealed and undivided heritage of the universal Church.

The same "dignity" and "apostolic" inheritance of the eastern churches had been confirmed by Pope Leo XIII in an encyclical letter issued in 1894, Orientalium dignitas.

=== The individual Churches or rites ===
The document states that the individual Churches within the one Holy Catholic Church, whether Eastern or Western, are all of equal dignity. The individual Churches merit both protection and advancement.

- "Each individual Church or Rite should retain its traditions whole and entire" but "should adapt its way of life to the different needs of time and place" (§2)

- The individual Churches, whether Eastern or Western, are of equal dignity (§3)

- Every Catholic must retain his own rite, cherish and protect it (§4).

Noting that "the Churches of the East, as much as those of the West, have a full right and are in duty bound to rule themselves, each in accordance with its own established disciplines" (§5), the decree makes "preservation of the spiritual heritage of the Eastern Churches" a duty for all, especially for all members of the eastern churches themselves". The churches may need to take steps to rectify the loss of their traditions due to what it calls the "contingencies of times and persons" (§6).

=== Eastern Rite Patriarchs ===
- "The patriarchate, as an institution, has existed in the Catholic Church from the earliest times" (§7)

- All patriarchs are of equal dignity (§8)

- The rights and privileges of patriarchs "should be re-established in accordance with the ancient tradition of each of the Churches and the decrees of the ecumenical councils" (§9)

- "The patriarchs with their synods are the highest authority for all business of the patriarchate", subject to the Pope's right to intervene in individual cases (§9)

- New patriarchates should be established where there is a need (§11)

=== The discipline of the Sacraments ===
The discipline of the Sacraments (§12-18) is concerned with the regulation of the sacraments. An important issue is the right of priests of one rite to administer sacraments to faithful of another rite. It also recommends that the diaconate be restored as a permanent ministry.

=== Divine Worship ===
Divine Worship (§19-23) deals with the regulation of such liturgical matters as feast days (including Easter), the Divine Office and the languages to be used in the liturgy.

=== Relations with the Brethren of the Separated Churches ===
Eastern Catholics have a special duty to promote Christian unity, especially with Eastern Christians (§24), therefore:

- if a member of an Eastern Church becomes Catholic, "no more should be required of him than what a bare profession of the Catholic faith demands";
- an Eastern Christian priest or bishop is permitted to act as a priest or bishop upon joining the Catholic Church (§25);
- a "mild" or "conciliatory policy" (Latin: mitiorem rationem agendi) is adopted and renewed, whereby a member of an Eastern Church, asking of their own accord, may receive the sacraments of Penance, Eucharist and anointing of the sick from an Eastern Catholic priest, and an Eastern Catholic, if no Catholic priest is available, may receive these sacraments from a "ministers whose churches possess valid sacraments". Eastern Catholics and "Eastern separated brethren" may take part in each other's liturgical services "for a just cause" (§26-28);
- the patriarchs and hierarchs of the Eastern Catholic Churches are to take "care and control" of this policy through mutual consultation and the adoption of any necessary regulation (§29).

=== Conclusion ===
The concluding section (§30) asks all Christians, Eastern and Western, to pray for the reunion of Christians, and also to pray for those Christians suffering for their faith in Christ (a reference to Christians in communist countries).

== Concerns and responses ==
Some of the Council Fathers felt that the decree in its final form did not pay enough attention to the distinctive identity of the Eastern Churches. Another concern related to how well the decree addressed the complex diversity of its subject matter.

Bishop Nicholas Samra, Eparchial Bishop of Newton in the USA, observes that while the decree's assertion of equal dignity among the churches was clearly expressed, "recognition of this fact would take years to develop".
