= Vsevolod Maydansky =

Ukrainian Orthodox hierarch

Vsevolod (Maidansky)
- Archbishop of Skopelos
- Church: Eastern Orthodox Church
- Archdiocese: Ukrainian Orthodox Church of the USA
- Diocese: Western Eparchy
- Installed: 2000
- Term ended: 16 December 2007

Orders
- Ordination: 1985
- Consecration: 27 September 1987 by Archbishop Iakovos

Personal details
- Born: Vsevolod Vasylovych Kolomiytsev-Maidansky; 10 December 1927 Kalisz, Poland
- Died: 16 December 2007 (aged 80) Chicago, Illinois, United States
- Buried: St. Andrew's Cemetery, South Bound Brook, New Jersey

Archbishop Vsevolod (born Vsevolod Vasylovych Kolomiytsev-Maidansky; 10 December 1927 – 16 December 2007) was a Ukrainian Orthodox hierarch and head of the Ukrainian Orthodox Church in America. He later served as Archbishop of Skopelos in the Ukrainian Orthodox Church of the USA, under the jurisdiction of the Ecumenical Patriarchate of Constantinople.

== Biography ==
=== Early life and education ===
Vsevolod was born on 10 December 1927 in Kalisz, Poland, into the family of Archpriest Vasyl.

He received his theological education at the Orthodox Theological Seminary in Warsaw, where he served as a subdeacon to Metropolitan Dionysius of Warsaw, and at the Philosophical-Theological College of Dillingen in Germany.

In 1956, he emigrated to Australia. He earned a Bachelor of Arts degree in philosophy from the University of Sydney. Beginning in 1956, he also studied at the University of Melbourne in Victoria, Australia.

In 1964, he earned a master's degree in social problems from a branch of Yeshiva University in New York. He subsequently taught at the Albert Einstein College of Medicine of Yeshiva University and established a private practice.

=== Ecclesiastical career ===
In 1985, Vsevolod entered monastic life and was ordained to the priesthood by Metropolitan Andrew (Kuschak) of the Ukrainian Orthodox Church of the USA.

In 1987, with the blessing of Patriarch Demetrios I of Constantinople, Archimandrite Vsevolod was consecrated Bishop of Skopelos by Archbishop Iakovos, for the Ukrainian Orthodox Church in America under the jurisdiction of the Ecumenical Patriarchate of Constantinople.

The episcopal consecration took place on 27 September 1987 at Holy Trinity Cathedral in New York City. The participating hierarchs included Archbishop Iakovos, Patriarchal Exarch in America, Metropolitan Silas, and Bishops Athenagoras and Philip.

In 1996, his jurisdiction united with the Ukrainian Orthodox Church of the USA, which had entered the jurisdiction of the Ecumenical Patriarchate of Constantinople. In 2000, he was assigned to Chicago with the rank of archbishop.

In 1999, Archbishop Vsevolod published a collection entitled We Are All Brothers, containing articles and addresses devoted to ecumenical themes.

=== Ecumenical activities ===
As a representative of the Ecumenical Patriarch, Archbishop Vsevolod participated in ecumenical meetings and conferences, including the Kyivan Church Study Group.

He represented the Ecumenical Patriarch at the Jerusalem Conference on Science and Religion and at a religious conference in Milan. He was a member of the Standing Conference of the Canonical Orthodox Bishops in the Americas and participated in Orthodox–Catholic episcopal dialogue.

=== Position on the canonical status of the Kyivan Metropolitanate ===
On 24 March 2005, during a meeting with Ukrainian President Viktor Yushchenko, Archbishop Vsevolod of Skopelos made the following statement:

The Mother Church, the Patriarchate of Constantinople, considers that its daughter, the Patriarchate of Moscow, possesses the canonical territory that belonged to that Church before 1686. The subordination of the Kyivan Metropolitanate to the Church of Moscow was carried out by Patriarch Dionysius without the consent and approval of the Holy and Sacred Synod of the Great Church of Christ.

=== Awards and honors ===
In 2002, Archbishop Vsevolod was awarded the Order of Merit, Third Class, by the President of Ukraine (Presidential Decree No. 1146/2002 of 11 December 2002).

In 2007, in recognition of his significant personal contribution to the harmonization of interconfessional relations, his charitable activities, and the occasion of his 80th birthday, the President of Ukraine awarded him the Order of Merit, Second Class (Presidential Decree No. 1206/2007 of 11 December 2007).

=== Death and funeral ===
In 2007, Archbishop Vsevolod underwent prolonged hospital treatment for leukemia.

He died in Chicago on 16 December 2007 following a serious illness.

On 26 December 2007, his funeral service was celebrated at St. Volodymyr Cathedral in Chicago. The service was presided over by Bishop Antony of New York and Washington and Bishop Andriy of London and Western Europe, together with numerous clergy of the Western Eparchy of the Ukrainian Orthodox Church of the USA.

He was buried at St. Andrew's Cemetery in South Bound Brook, New Jersey.

== Publications ==
- Vsevolod of Skopelos, Archbishop. Усі ми брати: Збірка праць (We Are All Brothers: Collected Works). Translated from English by O. Hrabovetsky. Lviv: Svichado, 2006. 340 pages. ISBN 966-8744-89-6.
