= Peter Galadza =

The Very Reverend Peter Galadza
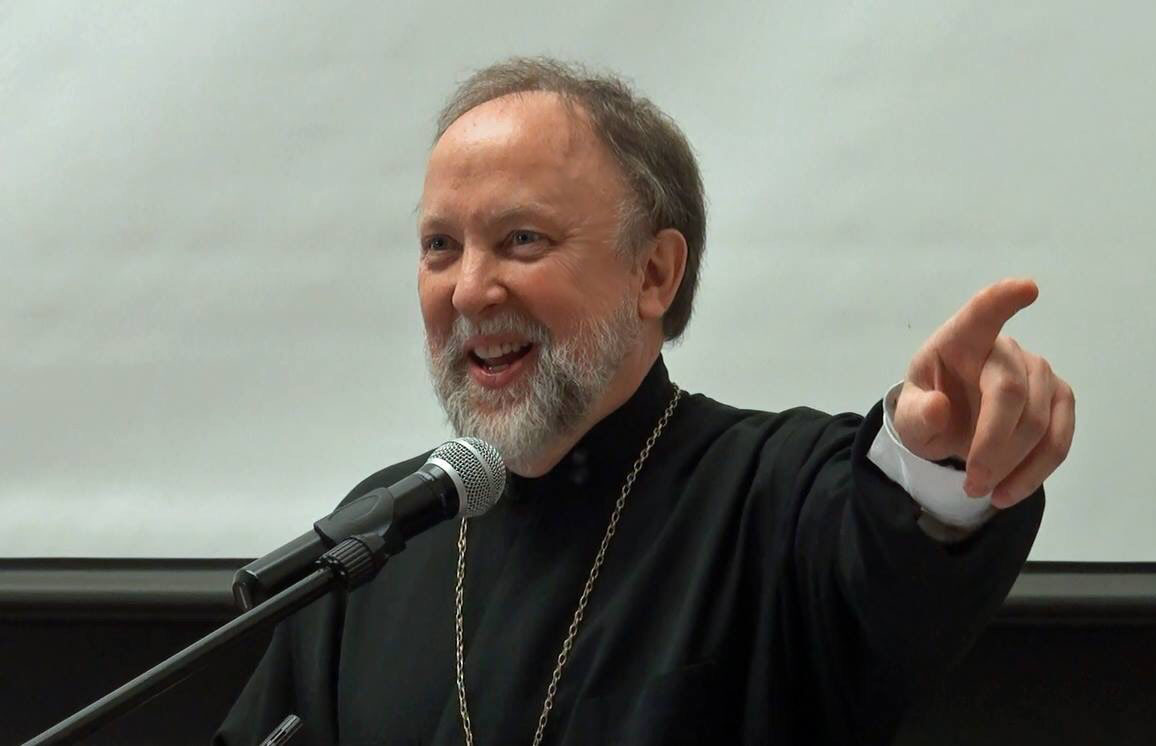
- Born: 5 May 1955 (age 71)

Academic background
- Education: University of Saint Michael's College, University of Toronto
- Thesis: The theological foundations of the liturgical work of Metropolitan Andrei Sheptytsky, 1865–1944 (1994)

Peter Galadza (born 5 May 1955) is a Canadian Greco-Catholic priest and theologian. He is director emeritus and professor emeritus of liturgy at the Metropolitan Andrey Sheptytsky Institute of Eastern Christian Studies in the Faculty of Theology, University of St. Michael's College, Toronto, Canada, and a member of the Faculty of Graduate Studies at the Toronto School of Theology. In 2003-2004 he was a fellow at Harvard University's Dumbarton Oaks Byzantine Research Center. In 2007 he was awarded a major, three-year, grant from the Social Sciences and Humanities Research Council of Canada (SSHRC) to study Ukrainian liturgical manuscripts. From 2010 to 2012 he was president of the international Society of Oriental Liturgy, founded by Robert F. Taft, SJ.

Galadza was among the Canadians sanctioned by Russia in relation to the Russian invasion of Ukraine on April 21, 2022.

== Biography ==
Galadza studied at McGill University in Montreal, at the University of St. Michael's College in the University of Toronto (B.A. 1976), at Catholic Theological Union in Chicago (M.Div. 1981), and at Notre Dame University in South Bend, Indiana (M.A. in Liturgy 1988). He earned his Ph.D. in theology from the University of Saint Michael’s College in the University of Toronto in 1994. He was ordained to the priesthood by Patriarch Josyf Slipyj on Lazarus Saturday, 18 April 1981 at the Monastery of St. Theodore Studite in Castel Gandolfo, Italy. Between 1994 and 2005 he was editor of Logos: A Journal of Eastern Christian Studies. Since 2014 he has been managing editor of the journal as well as acting director of the Metropolitan Andrey Sheptytsky Institute. He is married to Olenka Hanushevsky Galadza. They have three children: Daniel, Marika and Ivanka.

During the 1999-2000 academic year, Galadza served as dean of the L’viv Theological Academy in Ukraine (since 2002, The Ukrainian Catholic University), for which he was awarded the jeweled pectoral cross by Cardinal Lubomyr Husar. For several years he was the director of the Institute of Liturgical Studies at the Ukrainian Catholic University. He became the Institute's first director in 1999. In 2011 he was elected a fellow at the Centre for Research on Religion (CREOR) at McGill University.

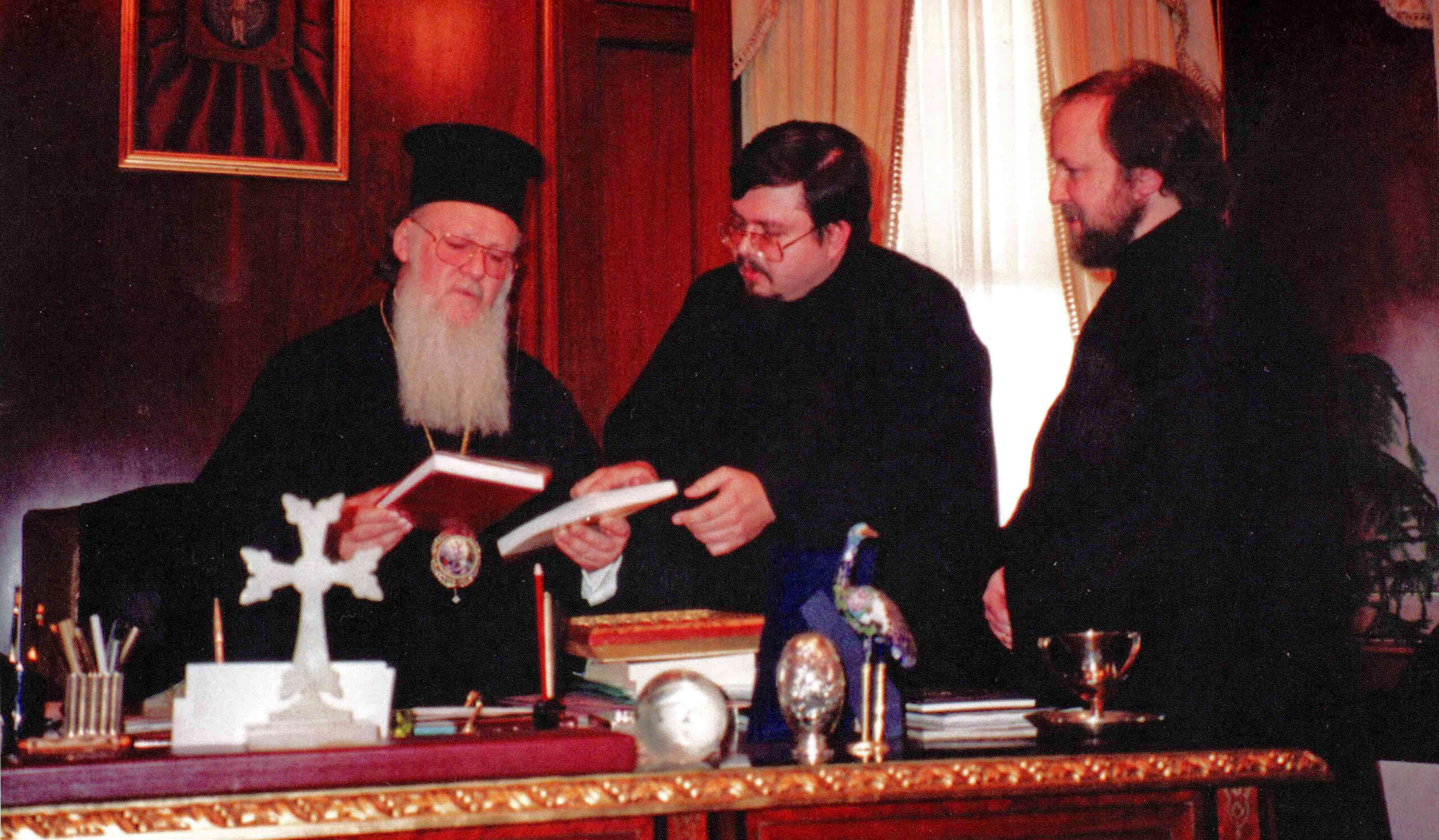
Patriarch Bartholomew of Constantinople, Andriy Chirovsky and Peter Galadza

Galadza's thought in the area of liturgical reform is the subject of a chapter entitled "La riforma liturgica nel pensiero di P. Galadza" in a book by the liturgist Marcel Mojzeš, Il movimento liturgico nelle Chiese bizantine, Bibliotheca «Ephemerides Liturgicae» Subsidia 132 (Rome, 2005).

=== Videos ===
Some of Galadza's lectures and presentations can be viewed on YouTube.

== Selected bibliography ==
- The Theology and Liturgical Work of Andrei Sheptytsky, Orientalia Christiana Analecta 272, Rome, 2004 () ISBN 9788872103456
- The Divine Liturgy: An Anthology for Worship, Ottawa, 2004 () ISBN 9781895937121
- Unité en division: Les lettres de Lev Gillet (“Un moine de l’Eglise d’Orient”) à Andrei Cheptytsky – 1921-1929, Parole et Silence, 2007 () ISBN 9782845737235
- Galadza, Peter (2007). "Eastern Catholic Christianity". The Blackwell Companion to Eastern Christianity. Malden, MA: Blackwell Publishing. pp. 291–318. ISBN 9780470766392.
- Archbishop Andrei Sheptytsky and the Ukrainian Jewish Bond, Ottawa and Toronto: Ukrainian Jewish Encunter, 2014 ()
