= Boniface Luykx =

Belgian Norbertine priest and scholar

Boniface Luykx (1915-2004) was a Belgian Norbertine priest, professor, and liturgical scholar. He was a leader of the Catholic Liturgical Movement in the 1940s and 1950s, and taught for many years in the Summer School of Liturgy at Notre Dame University. Appointed as a peritus (expert) of the Second Vatican Council, he was one of the authors of the Council's Sacrosanctum Concilium, the Constitution on the Sacred Liturgy. During the years 1960 to 1971 he was a missionary in Africa, where he founded the Monastère de l’Assomption and taught at the University of Lovanium in Kinshasa, Zaire (now the Democratic Republic of the Congo). From 1972 to 2000 he was the founding abbot of Holy Transfiguration (Mt. Tabor) Monastery, located in Northern California and part of the Ukrainian Greek Catholic Church. In 1988 he was given the honorary title Archimandrite, which in the Eastern Christian Churches denotes the spiritual father of one or more monasteries.

== Selected works ==
- De oorsprong van het gewone der Mis. De Eredienst der Kerk, No. 3. Utrecht-Antwerp: Spectrum, 1955.
- La Confirmation: doctrine et pastorale. Bruges: Apostolat Liturgique, Abbaye de Saint-André, 1958.
- Culte chrétien en Afrique après Vatican II. Immensee: Nouvelle Revue de Science Missionnaire, 1974.
- Eastern Monasticism and the Future of the Church. Stamford, CT: Basileos Press, 1993.
- A Wider View of Vatican II: Memories and Analysis of a Council Consultor. Edited by Julie Rogers. Brooklyn, NY: Angelico Press, 2025.
