= Iwan Dacko =

Ukrainian priest, theologian, and professor

- Івáн Дацькó
- Born: 9 September 1947 (age 79); Velbert, Germany
- Education: Pontifical University Urbaniana; University of Innsbruck
- Occupations: Priest; Theologian; professor
- Title: Private Secretary of Patriarch Josyf Cardinal Slipyj; President of the Institute of Ecumenical Studies at the Ukrainian Catholic University; Member of the Joint International Commission for the Theological Dialogue between the Catholic and Orthodox Churches

Iwan Dacko (Ukrainian: Івáн Дацькó; born 9 September 1947 in Velbert, North Rhine-Westphalia, Germany) is a priest of the Ukrainian Greek Catholic Church, was personal secretary of Patriarch Josyf Cardinal Slipyj, a close collaborator and Chancellor of Myroslav Ivan Cardinal Lubachivsky, President of the Institute of Ecumenical Studies at the Ukrainian Catholic University in Lviv, Ukraine, a long-time member of the Joint International Commission and its Coordinating Committee for the theological dialogue between the Catholic and Orthodox Churches.

== Biography ==
Born in the town of Velbert, the land of North Rhine-Westphalia in Germany 9 September 1947, in the family of Wasyl Dacko and Kateryna née Lesczyszak, Ukrainian laborers deported to Germany during World War Two. The parents had four children, of whom the eldest son, Wolodymyr, also became a priest. In August 1948, the family moved to Great Britain, and initially lived in camps for displaced persons in the county of Stafford, and then moved to the town of Rochdale, in the Greater Manchester Area.

== Education ==
Upon completion of elementary education, in 1957–1963 Iwan Dacko studied at the Pontifical Ukrainian Minor Seminary in Castelgandolfo and Rome. In 1963–1967, he was a student at the Pontifical Ukrainian College of St. Josaphat in Rome and the Pontifical University Urbaniana, where he obtained a bachelor's degree in Philosophy and Bachelor of Theology. From 1967–1970, he studied and obtained excellent formation at the International Theological College Canisianum and at the Theological Faculty of the University of Innsbruck. Austria, where he defended his paper Metropolitan Petro Mohyla (1596–1647) in the light of history and dogma and obtained received the master's degree in theology (15 July 1970).

After becoming a priest in 1971, he specialized at the Faculty of Theology of the University of Innsbruck for another three years in the field of dogmatic theology, ecumenism and church history. On 8 June 1974, he became the doctor of theology after defending his thesis "Metropolitan Andrey Sheptytsky - the Restorer of Traditional Eastern Ecclesiology and Ecumenism".

== Activity in the Ukrainian diaspora ==
On 11 April 1971, In Castelgandolfo (Rome) the head of the Ukrainian Greek Catholic Church, Cardinal Josyf Slipyj ordained Iwan Dacko to the priesthood. In 1970–1976 he served as prefect of the College of Saint Sophia in Rome, and in 1976-1989 he was a lecturer of the Ukrainian Catholic University (then in Rome). From 1976 to 1984 he worked as secretary of the Patriarch Josyf Cardinal Slipyj. In the same period he held a number of other positions: from 14 October 1978, he became a Canon of the Lviv Archeparchial Chapter (Krylos), and on 12 July 1982 - Chancellor of the Lviv Archeparchy of the Ukrainian Greek Catholic Church.

After the death of Patriarch Josyf Cardinal Slipyj on 7 September 1984, Iwan Dacko in 1984–1985 was secretary of Cardinal Myroslav Ivan Lubachivsky. On 16 April 1985, he was appointed Chancellor of the Lviv Archeparchy, and on January 4, 1989, Ivan Dacko received the title of Monsignor.

Father Iwan Dacko worked in the field of journalism for many years. In 1983–1990 he was chief editor of the monthly "News from Rome" (Visti z Rymu); in 1987–1990 - editor in chief of the Ukrainian Press Service in Ukrainian, English, French, and German. His task at that time was to bring true information to the Free World about the persecution of the religion and the Church of the USSR and its Satellite States from the socialist camp. He raised these issues in his public speeches and sermons

"Nowadays in the West, one can hear about the remnants of British, American or other imperialism or colonialism, as if not noticing that the whole USSR is the last macabre empire of the twentieth century, where human rights are trampled systematically on a daily basis. We must talk about this. Martyrs and Confessors of our time are awaiting this from us! They expect from us concrete constant Christian help and solidarity! Our brothers and sisters in Ukraine are silent Church and cannot speak. And here we nobody forbids us to speak. We dare not be silent because out of opportunism or laziness. We not only can, but we must talk about such injustices. This is our sacred duty, otherwise, we are not worthy to be called Christians."

Iwan Dacko approved of the disintegration of the USSR, the fall of Communism and the reestablishment of the Ukrainian Greek-Catholic Church after 43 years. On multiple occasions, he called for the Ukrainian Diaspora to help support the Church and those living in Ukraine.

Since Iwan Dacko was the closest co-worker of the Head of the Ukrainian Greek Catholic Church, Myroslav Ivan Lubachivsky, and had unique contacts with various representatives of the human rights movement in the USSR, in 1986–1995 the Vatican various members of the Roman Curia and diplomats to the Holy See considered him one of the best experts on the religious question of Ukraine and throughout the USSR. In this period, he was strongly supported by the founder of the Aid to the Church in Need, Fr. Werenfried van Straaten, O. Praem., who made him his main coordinator of all projects of the Ukrainian Greek-Catholic Church in Ukraine and the diaspora.

== Return to Ukraine ==
On 30 March 1991, Dacko returned permanently to Lviv with Cardinal Myroslav Ivan Lubachivsky and from June 1991 to July 1994 served as Protosyncellos (Vicar General) of the Lviv Archeparchy of the Ukrainian Greek-Catholic Church. From July 1993 to February 1997 he was Chancellor of the Patriarchal Curia of the Major Archbishop (Patriarch) of the Ukrainian Greek Catholic Church. On 19 December 1995, Iwan Dacko received the title of Mitred Protopresbyter.

In February 1997, he was appointed Responsible for the External Affairs of the Ukrainian Greek-Catholic Church and co-chairman of the Commission on Theological Education and the Priestly Formation. From April 2000 until 2005, Dacko was president of the International Bureau for Development of the Ukrainian Greek Catholic Church in Ukraine. Since February 2003, he is a professor of ecumenical theology at the Ukrainian Free University in Munich. Since April 2003, he is also the professor of ecumenical theology and president of the UCU Ecumenical Studies Institute in Lviv and a member of the Ukrainian Catholic University's rectorate. In July 2003 Iwan Dacko was elected Dean of the Faculty of Philosophy of the Ukrainian Free University in Munich.

On 14 December 2005, Dacko was appointed a member of the Joint International Commission for Theological Dialogue between the Catholic and Orthodox Churches. From March 2008 until November 2013, he served as President of the "Saint Sophia" Religious Association for Ukrainian Catholics in Italy. As of 25 October 2008, Dacko is the director of St. Clement's Institute of the Ukrainian Greek-Catholic Church and in 2008–2013 he was also the director and in charge of the Historical Archives of the Ukrainian Greek-Catholic Church in Rome. On 27 October 2016, Dacko was appointed a member of the Coordinating Committee of the Joint International Commission for the Theological Dialogue between the Catholic and Orthodox Churches.

== Writings ==
During the last years (1972–1974) of his studies at the University of Innsbruck, Fr. Iwan Dacko intended to devote himself entirely to academic work. According to the rector of UCU, Rev. Bohdan Prach, in 1973 Dacko was offered the post of the assistant of the Institute of dogmatic theology at the University of Innsbruck. However, complying to the will of Patriarch Josyf Slipyj, he came back to Rome to assist the head of the UGCC.

He became lecturer of Dogmatic Theology, History of Ecumenical Councils and Ecumenical Theology at the UCU in Rome (1974) and gradually took over the administrative work in the chancery of Cardinal Josyf Slipystanding priests and bishops of the Ukrainian Gree-Catholic Church, such as Ivan Hrynioch, Ivan Choma, Ivan Muzyczka, Lubomyr Husar and others. Nevertheless, he also found time for writing and publishing important articles and books, such as:

- Pope John Paul II and the Ukrainian Catholic Church // Bohoslovia 52 (1985) 5;
- Patriarch Josyf's Work in Translating Liturgical Books (2005);
- Cardinal Myroslav Ivan Lubachivsky: One Year After His Death;
- Closest Coworkers of Patriarch Josyf: Rev. Ivan Choma and Rev. Ivan Muzyczka;
- Ivan Hrynioch – Outstanding Priest and Theologian of the 20th Century // Bohoslovia 63: 3-4 (2003) 115–127;
- Laudatio in Honor of Dr. Anna-Halja Horbatsch (2004);
- Obituary Homily at the Funeral of Rev. Ivan Muzyczka (2016);
- The Ukrainian Catholic Church in Ukraine – 1987 (1987);
- 988 – 1988: Ukrainian Greek Catholics Commemorating the Millennium of their Baptism (1989);
- The Ukrainian Catholic Church on the Eve of its Legalization (1989);
- The Ukrainian Catholic Church Today: an Encounter on Site (with Marko Tomashek), 1990;
- Relations between the Ukrainian Greek-Catholic Church with other Denominations in Ukraine, 1992;
- New Abysses in Europe? Reconciliation – Task of the Churches in Ukraine, Belarus, Poland and Germany, 1997;
- The Role of the Ukrainian Diaspora in the Rebirth of the Ukrainian Greek-Catholic Church (1946-1989), 2009;
- "Traditional" Churches in Independent Ukraine: In Search of Common Identity (with Oleh Turiy), 2012
- The Contribution of the Ukrainian Greek-Catholic Church towards Ecumenism, 1999;
- Reflections Regarding the Role of the Eastern Catholic Churches and Their Future, 2001;
- The Kyivan Church and the Union of Brest, 2002;
- Heterodoxy: How is the Dispute on Religious Truth Being Conducted? 2003;
- The Place of Eastern Churches in Catholic Communion and their Role in the Ecumenical Work of the Church, 2006;
- The Ministry of the Bishop of Rome in the 9th Century, 2008;
- Memorandum on the Conversation with Archbishop Hilarion Alfeyev, (2009);
- Greek-Catholic Churches and the Contemporary Ecumenical Dialogue with the Orthodox Church, 2009;
- Experiences from the International Orthodox-Catholic Dialogue Commission, 2012;
- Ecumenism within Religious Persecutions, 2012.

The Institute of Ecumenical Studies of UCU published a large number of articles of Fr. Iwan Dacko in a separate book with the title: У пошуках єдности і правди – In Search of Unity and Truth. Lviv, 2017 (448 pages).
