= Exaltation of the Holy Cross Church, Zazdrist =

Ukrainian Orthodox church in Zazdrist, Ukraine

Exaltation of the Holy Cross church Церква Воздвиження Чесного Хреста Господнього
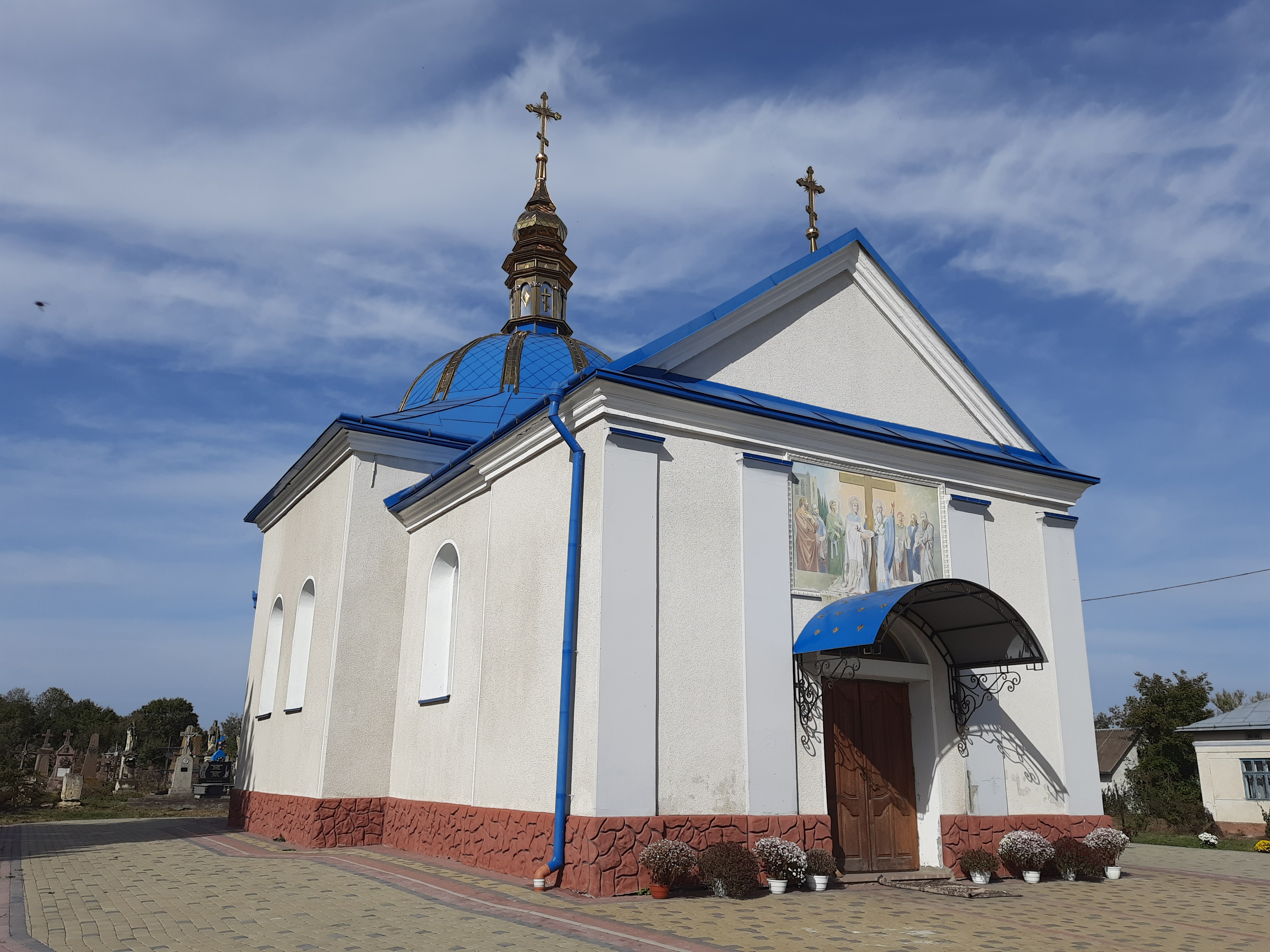

- Location within Ternopil Oblast

Religion
- Affiliation: Orthodox Church of Ukraine

Location
- Location: Zazdrist, Mykulyntsi settlement hromada, Ternopil Raion, Ternopil Oblast, Ukraine
- Coordinates: 49°21′01.7″N 25°30′43.5″E

Architecture
- Completed: 1876

Exaltation of the Holy Cross Church (Ukrainian: Церква Воздвиження Чесного Хреста Господнього) is an Orthodox parish church (OCU) in Zazdrist of the Mykulyntsi settlement hromada of the Ternopil Raion of the Ternopil Oblast.

== History ==
Once, the village had an old wooden church that was destroyed by a lightning strike. In its place, a new red stone church was built in 1876, funded by the family of Cardinal Josyf Slipyj and the local community. The main benefactor was Countess Mariia Borkovska, who allocated the land for the construction. A stone bell tower with three bells was also erected; the bells were purchased in Przemyśl by Roman Dychkovskyi (Josyf Slipyj's grandfather), and engraved with the names of the founders.

In the summer of 1943, villagers managed to bury the large and small bells to hide them, while German forces succeeded in taking the third one. In 2002, the buried bells were recovered and reinstalled in the bell tower.

The church stands on the grounds of the old cemetery, near the grave of Cardinal Josyf Slipyj's parents. The cemetery is notable for its ancient tombstones made of red sandstone. The estate of the Cardinal's parents has been preserved, and in 1998, the "Native House" Museum and Memorial Complex of Patriarch Josyf Slipyj was opened on its territory.

== Priests ==
- о. Petro Rozhalovskyi
