= Sts. Volodymyr and Olha Ukrainian Catholic Church =

Ukrainian Catholic parish in Chicago

Coordinates: 41.89514°N 87.6838°W

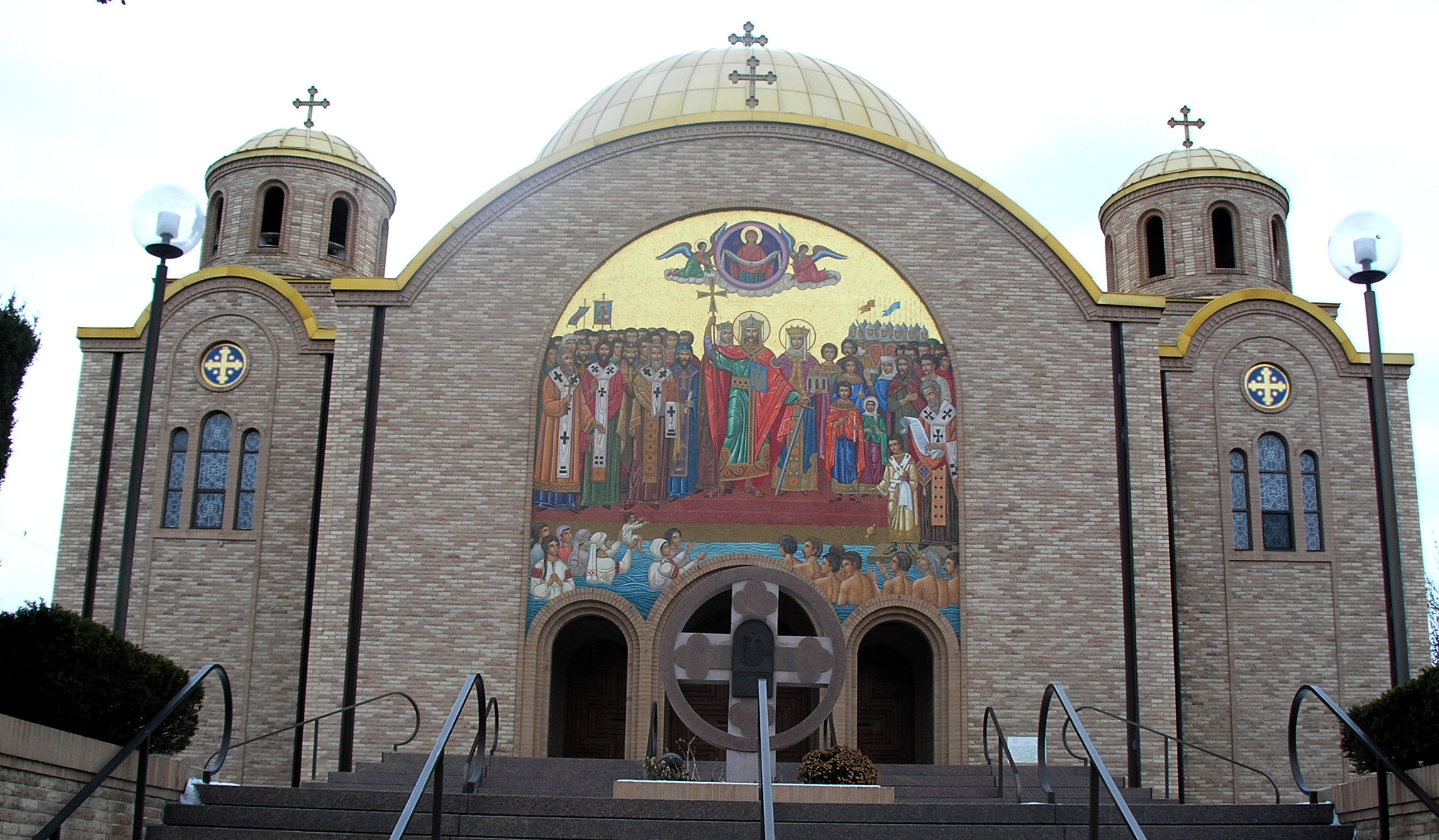
Saints Volodymyr and Olha Ukrainian Greek Catholic Church, Chicago, IL.

Sts. Volodymyr and Olha Church is a Ukrainian Greek Catholic Church in Chicago, Illinois.

The church building is one of the landmarks of the Ukrainian Village, a historic district in the near West side of Chicago. It is known for its distinctive architecture and art work.

== History ==
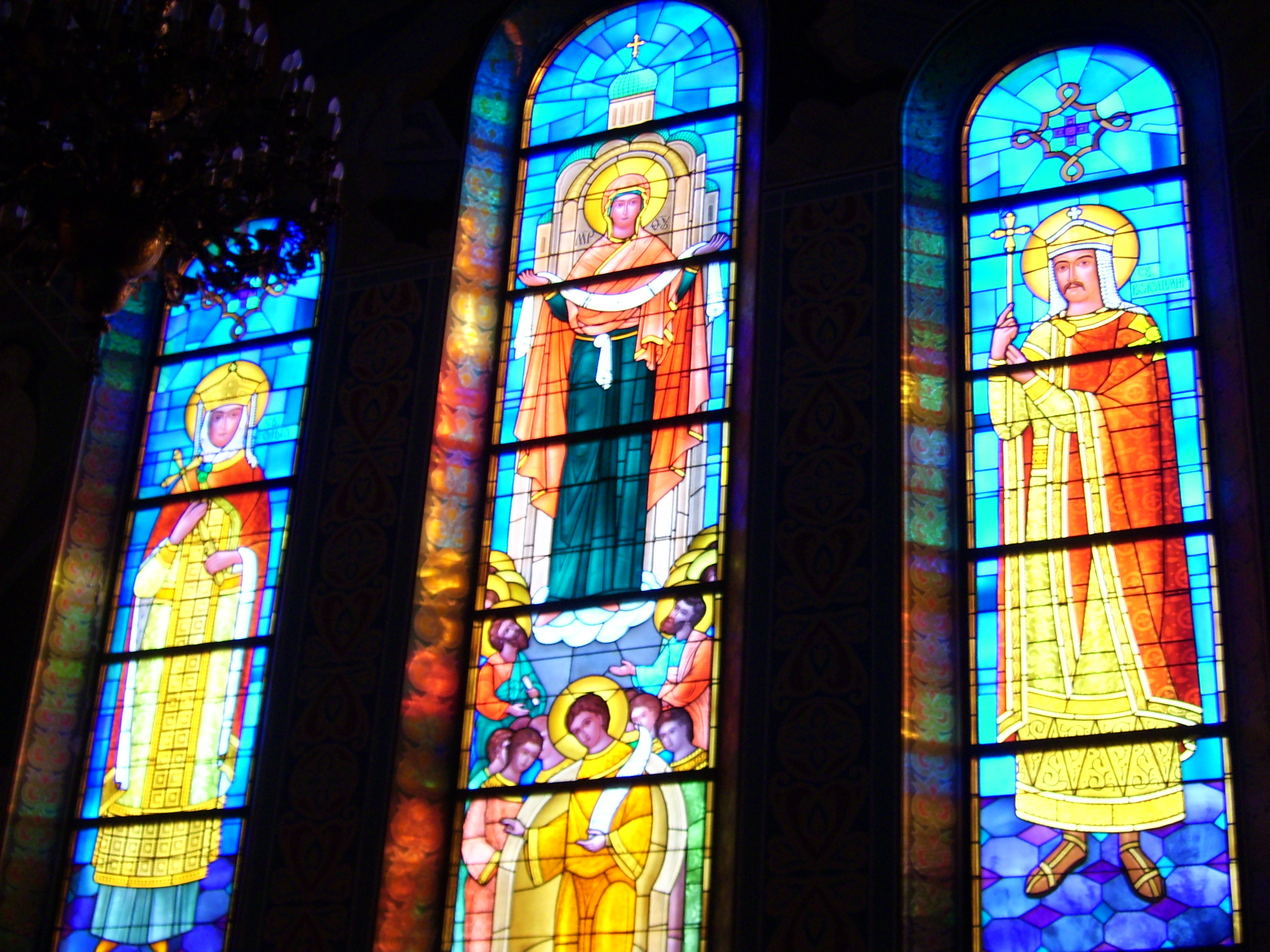
A view of the stained glass windows in the southern apse inside Volodymyr and Olha Ukrainian Catholic Church.

Sts. Volodymyr and Olha Ukrainian Catholic Parish in Chicago was founded in 1969 by Patriarch Josyf Slipyj and the bishop of the Eparchy of Chicago, Yaroslav Gabro. Among the reasons for establishing this distinct parish was the desire to preserve and faithfully adhere to the traditions of the Ukrainian Church and support members of the parish by giving a variety of community organizations use of the space. The elements contributing to the Ukrainian Greek Catholic Church's distinctiveness within the Catholic Church are the Julian Calendar, the Byzantine Rite in the Ukrainian recension, as well as a rich ethnic spiritual heritage.

== Structure and interior ==
Construction of the new church was completed between 1971 and 1973. Architect Yaroslav Korsunsky of Minneapolis designed the church, employing the Byzantine-Ukrainian style of 11–13th century Ukraine. Churches of this style are traditionally cruciform, with the altar facing to the East. The rounded gold dome, along with a strong preference for circular patterns - avoiding almost all angular design elements - is also typical of this style.

A mosaic above the entrance depicts the Christianization of Ukraine, and there is a statue of the parish's founder, Patriarch Josyf Slipyj, who was held prisoner in the Soviet Union’s Siberian labor camps for 18 years before moving to the US.

The iconostasis's central doors ("royal gates") depict the four Gospel authors; over the gates are the Last Supper. Also on the iconostas are St. Nicholas, St. John the Baptist, as well as St. Volodymyr and Saint Olha.

The wooden frame of the iconostas was hand-carved from oak by Paul Mozes of New York. The icons are the work of Ivan Dykyj. The stained glass windows are the work of Yaroslaw Baransky of Yonkers, New York. The windows in the southern apse portray the Protection of the Mother of God, flanked by Saint Volodymyr and Saint Olha. The windows in the northern apse portray some of the patron saints of Ukraine: Saint Andrew the Apostle, who first came to Ukraine to proclaim the word of God, Saint George (Yuriy) the Conqueror, and Saint Michael the Archangel.

In the dome, which represents heaven, is an image of Christ the Pantocrator (Creator of all). Descending, are images of the events of salvation history. At ground level are images of the saints, suggesting that the church is the union of heaven and earth as well as the past and the present. The crucifixion is portrayed in the northern apse, while in the southern apse we see the events leading to the resurrection. This placement emphasizes that there are two aspects to a single reality.

== Ukrainian Cultural Center ==
The Ukrainian Cultural Center at Sts. Volodymyr and Olha Parish was founded to serve the Ukrainian Greek Catholic parish community as well as future generations of Ukrainian-Americans, primarily through Ukrainian language outreach. The construction of this complex was completed in 1988. In commemoration of the Millennium of Christianity in Ukraine, a memorial statue of Sts. Prince Volodymyr and Princess Olha was constructed next to the Cultural Center in 1989.

Various parish-related organizations as well as art associations, scientific organizations, and professional and national groups use the Cultural Center. Most notable among these are the Hromovytsia, Ukrainian School of Dance, the Ukrainian Catholic University, representatives of the Ukrainian Congressional Committee of America, and scientific organizations such as The Ukrainian Encyclopedia, the Ukrainian Medical Association and others. Various receptions and events are regularly held in the Cultural Center for the Ukrainian community.

== See also ==
- Ukrainian Village, Chicago
- Ukrainian Catholic Eparchy of Chicago
