= Ukrainian Village, Chicago =

Neighborhood in Chicago, Illinois

Coordinates: 41.895989°N 87.683734°W

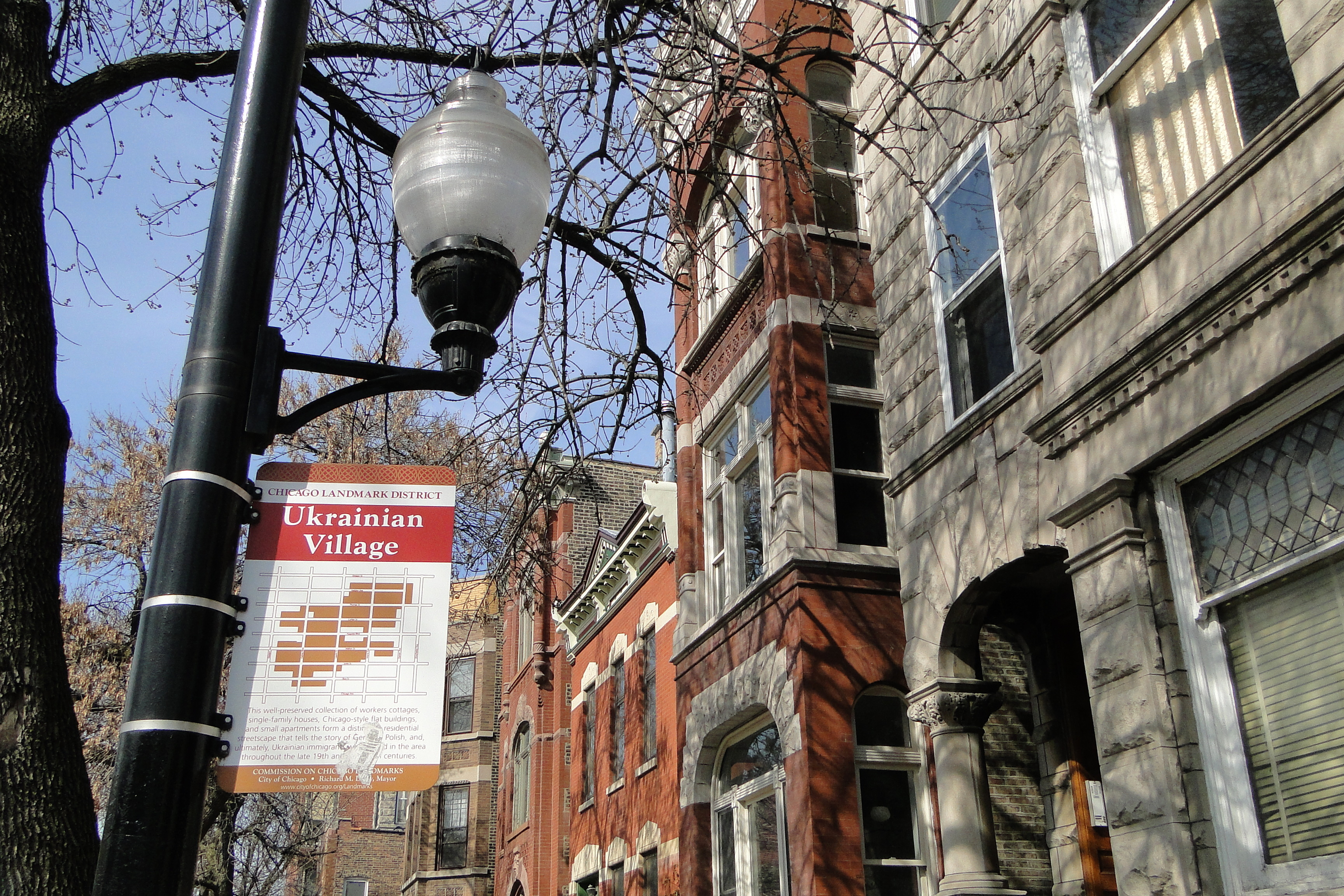
Ukrainian Village Street Scene - Chicago - Illinois - USA

Ukrainian Village is a Chicago neighborhood located on the near west side of Chicago. Its boundaries are Division Street to the north, Grand Avenue to the south, Western Avenue to the west (although some maps extend to Campbell Street to the west), and Damen Avenue to the east. It is one of the neighborhoods in the West Town community area, and has one of the largest concentrations of Ukrainian Americans in the United States, as the commercial and spiritual hub for nearly 70,000 Ukrainians in the greater Chicago region.

== History ==
Ukrainian Village, like neighboring East Village, began as farmland. Originally, German Americans, who came mostly as immigrants in the mid-19th century, formed the largest ethnic group in the vicinity. With new waves of immigration starting in the late 19th century, by the turn of the century, the neighborhood was largely Slavic. Similar to Chicago's Lithuanian Downtown in Bridgeport, Ukrainians settled in the district because of their familiarity with Poles who lived in the surrounding Polish Downtown. Dense settlement of the neighborhood was largely spurred by the 1895 construction of an elevated train line along Paulina Ave (1700 W), which provided access to workplaces. It was decommissioned in 1964.

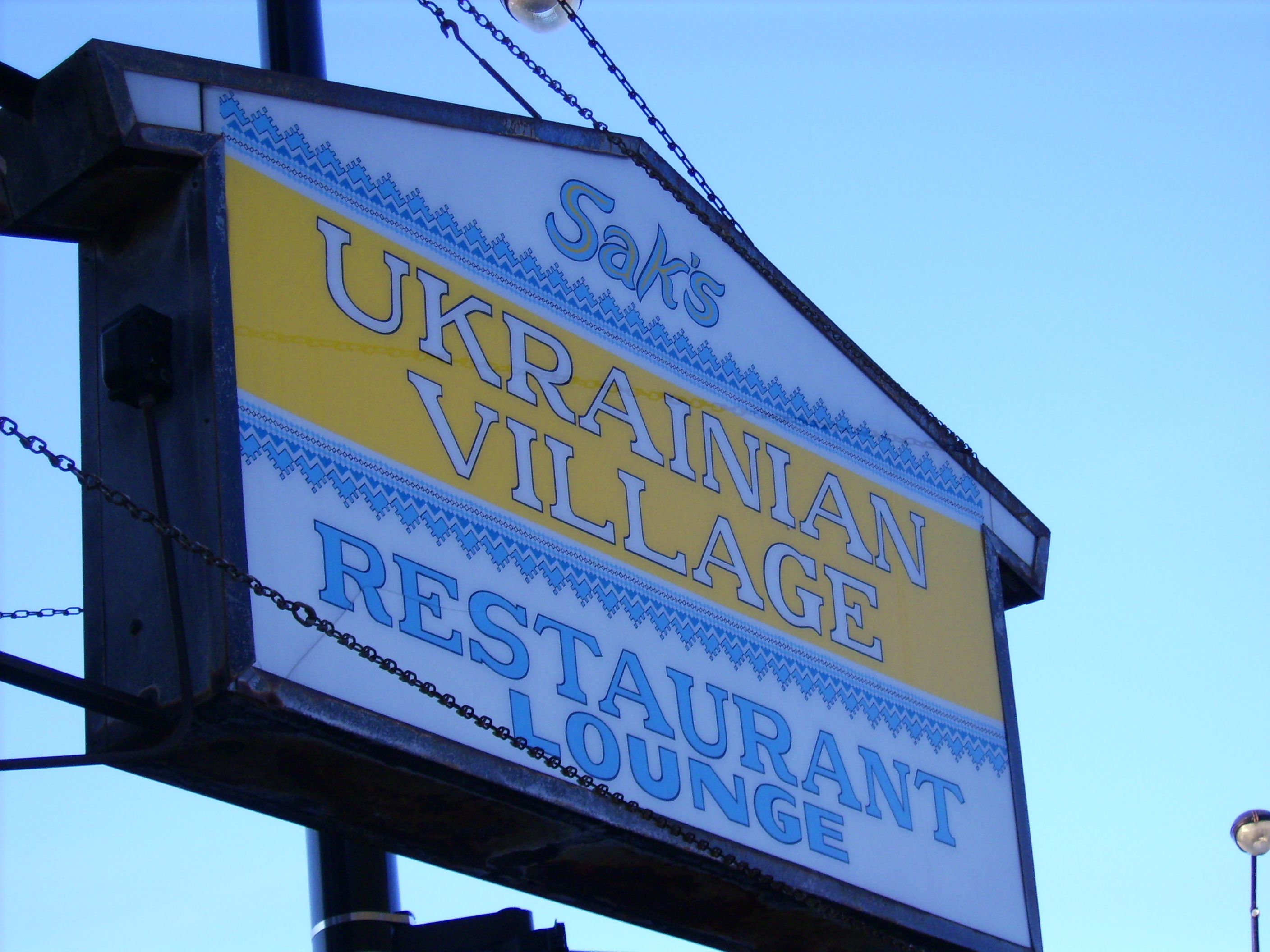
A restaurant in Ukrainian Village with the colors of the Ukrainian flag.

The Ukrainian community in the Chicago metropolitan area is not localized, but there was a concentration of immigrants and their descendants in what is now known as Ukrainian Village. It has three major Ukrainian churches, Ukrainian-owned financial institutions, a Ukrainian-language grammar school, the Ukrainian National Museum, a Ukrainian Cultural Center, the Ukrainian Institute of Modern Art, two Ukrainian youth organizations, and many Ukrainian-owned restaurants, stores and businesses.

Over the past half century, Ukrainian Village has remained a middle-class neighborhood, populated largely by older citizens of Eastern European ancestry. It is bordered (and affected) on many sides by areas suffering more poverty and crime. There are also significant ethnic cultural institutions in the area. Although Ukrainian Village continues to be the center of Chicago's large Ukrainian community, the gentrification of West Town, Chicago community area is rapidly changing the demographic. Ukrainian Village is home to approximately 15,000 Ukrainian Americans.

Other notable local landmarks include Sts. Volodymyr and Olha Ukrainian Catholic Church, St. Nicholas Ukrainian Catholic Cathedral, St. Volodymyr Ukrainian Orthodox Cathedral, Roberto Clemente High School, St Mary's Hospital, and Holy Trinity Russian Orthodox Cathedral. The latter was commissioned by St. John Kochurov and designed by Louis Sullivan.

== Churches ==
There are several churches within Ukrainian Village, with three located on one street, and most being within a block of each other. St. Nicholas Ukrainian Catholic Cathedral was the first of the two Ukrainian Greek Catholic churches in the village. Sts. Volodymyr and Olha Ukrainian Catholic Parish in Chicago was established in the 1968 after parishioners of St. Nicholas parish had split in disagreement over the switch to the Gregorian calendar. During 1968-1973, until the new church was completed in 1973, parishioners attended and shared facilities at St. Volodymyr Ukrainian Orthodox Cathedral, located a few blocks north. As they both followed the Ukrainian traditional Julian calendar, sometimes also known as Eastern Rite or Eastern Orthodoxy. Lastly, a few more blocks northeast, is Holy Trinity Russian Orthodox Cathedral, the first Eastern European Russian Orthodox church to be built in what was then called the "Slavic Village". It was commissioned by St. John Kochurov and designed by Louis Sullivan.

=== St. Nicholas Ukrainian Catholic Cathedral ===
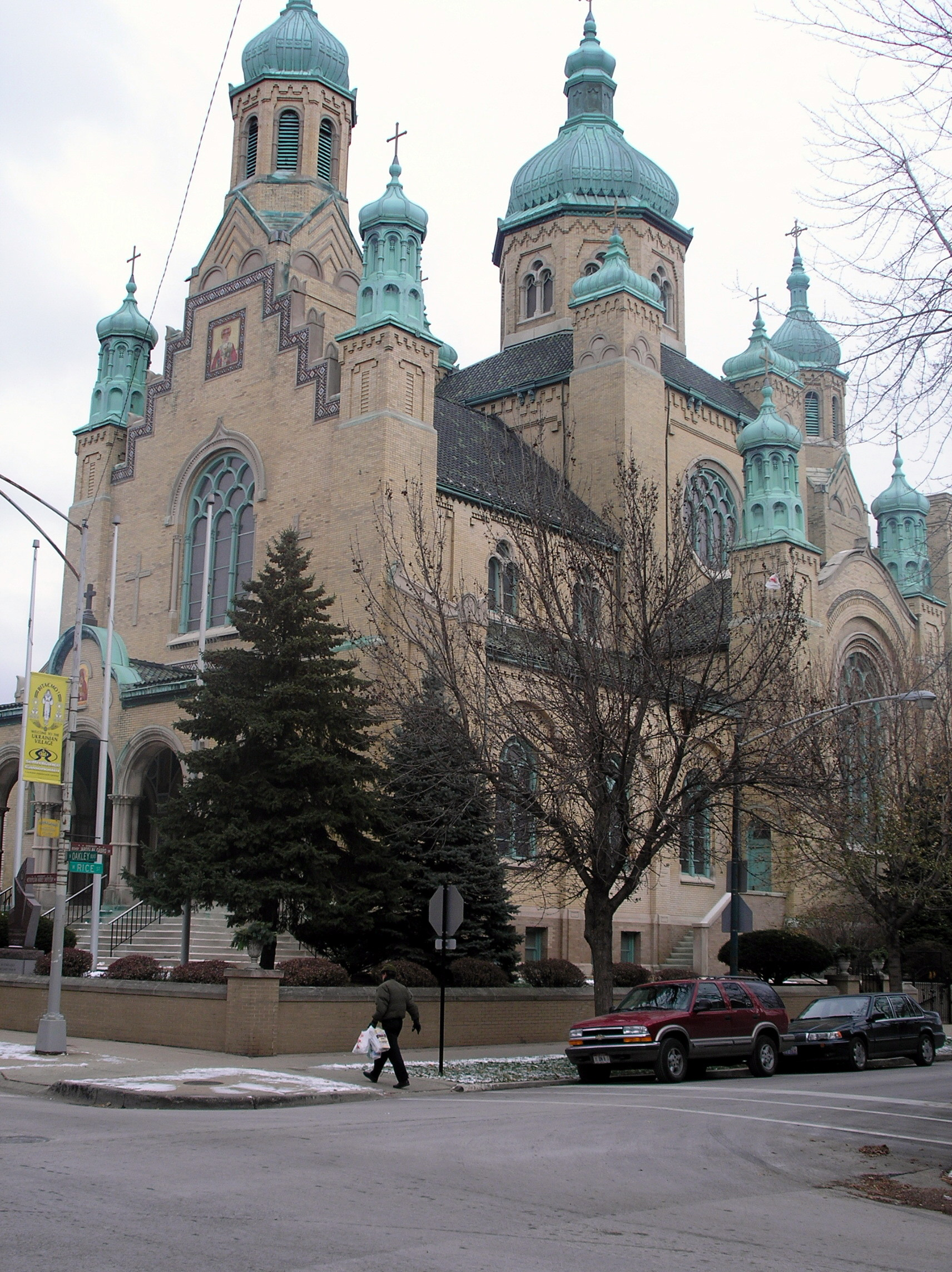
Saint Nicholas Ukrainian Catholic Cathedral

Chicago's Ukrainian history begins on the north side with the arrival of immigrants from western and Carpathian Ukraine in the late 1890s. At the time, they called themselves Rusyns (Ruthenians), an anachronistic national appellation associated with Ukraine's role within the Austro-Hungarian empire.

=== Sts. Volodymyr and Olha Ukrainian Catholic Parish in Chicago ===
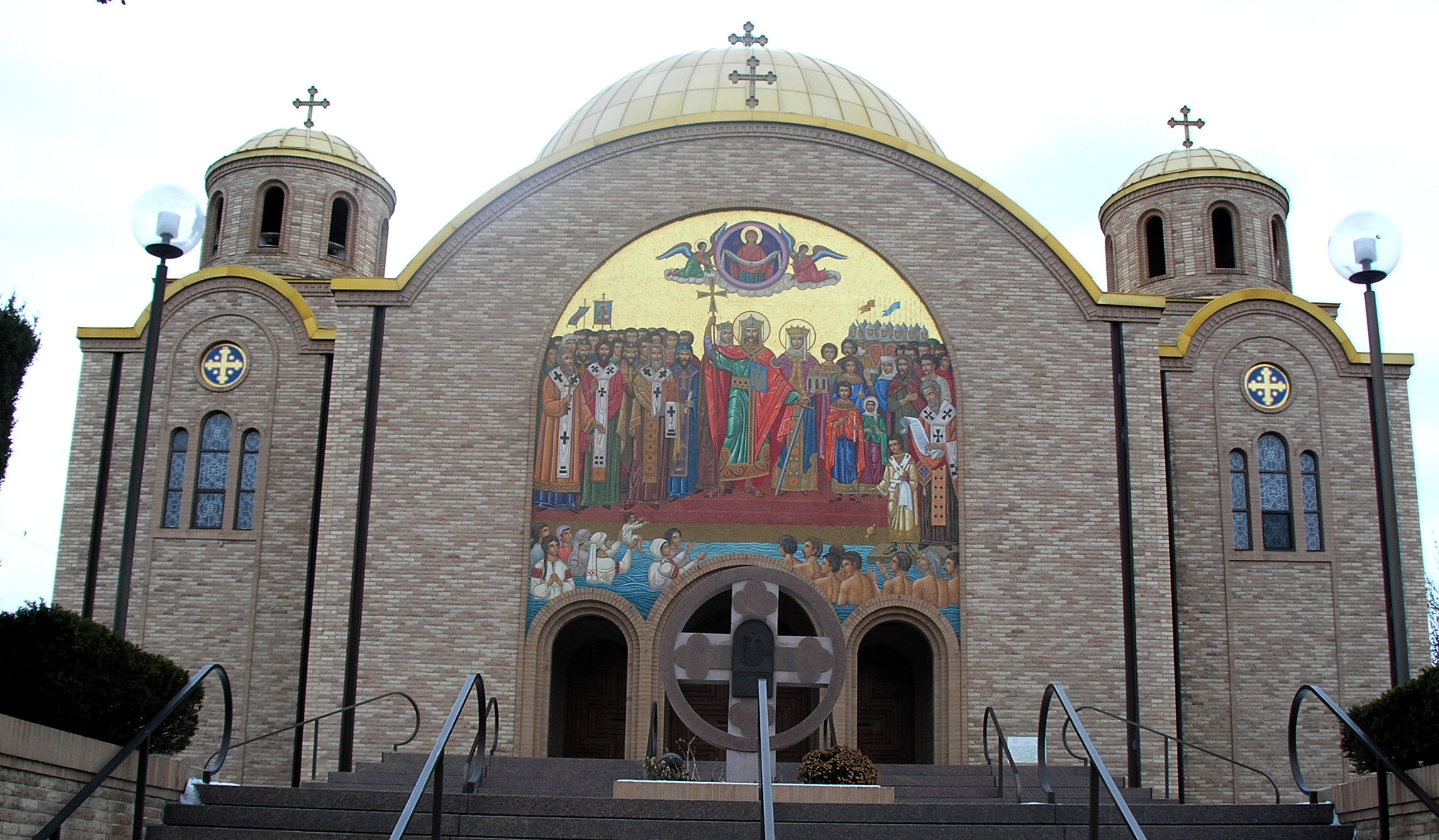
Saints Volodymyr and Olha Ukrainian Catholic Church

Sts. Volodymyr and Olha Ukrainian Catholic Parish in Chicago was founded in 1968 by Patriarch Josyf Slipyj and the bishop of the Eparchy of Chicago, Yaroslav Gabro. They and congregation members wanted to preserve and nurture the traditions of the Ukrainian Church. This church adheres to the Julian Calendar.

=== St. Volodymyr Ukrainian Orthodox Cathedral ===
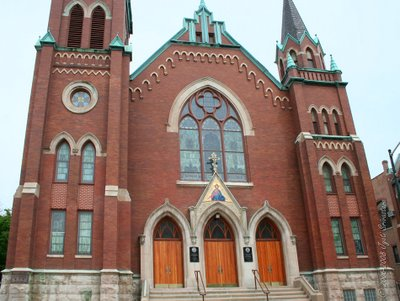
Saint Volodymyr Ukrainian Orthodox Cathedral

St. Volodymyr Ukrainian Orthodox Cathedral represents Eastern Orthodox Christianity, the dominant religion in Ukraine. St. Volodymyr UOC was established in 1916 and was originally named Holy Trinity Parish, until it was relocated from Erie Street to the corner of Cortez St. at Oakley Blvd. in 1946. It now serves second and third generation families, and fourth wave Ukrainian immigrants who began arriving after 1991.

Greek Orthodox in faith, the cathedral is part of the UOC USA, which is under the jurisdiction of the Ecumenical Patriarchate and is in full communion with the Orthodox Church of Ukraine.

The church building was originally built as a German Lutheran parish, and sold twice before finally purchased in 1946 and adapted for use by the current Ukrainian Orthodox parish.

== Ukrainian Village District ==
On December 4, 2002, the Ukrainian Village District, centering on Haddon Avenue, Thomas Street, and Cortez Street between Damen and Leavitt Avenues, including portions of Damen, Hoyne and Leavitt Avenues, was designated as a Chicago Landmark District. Extensions to the district were designated in 2005 and on April 11, 2007.

== Gallery ==
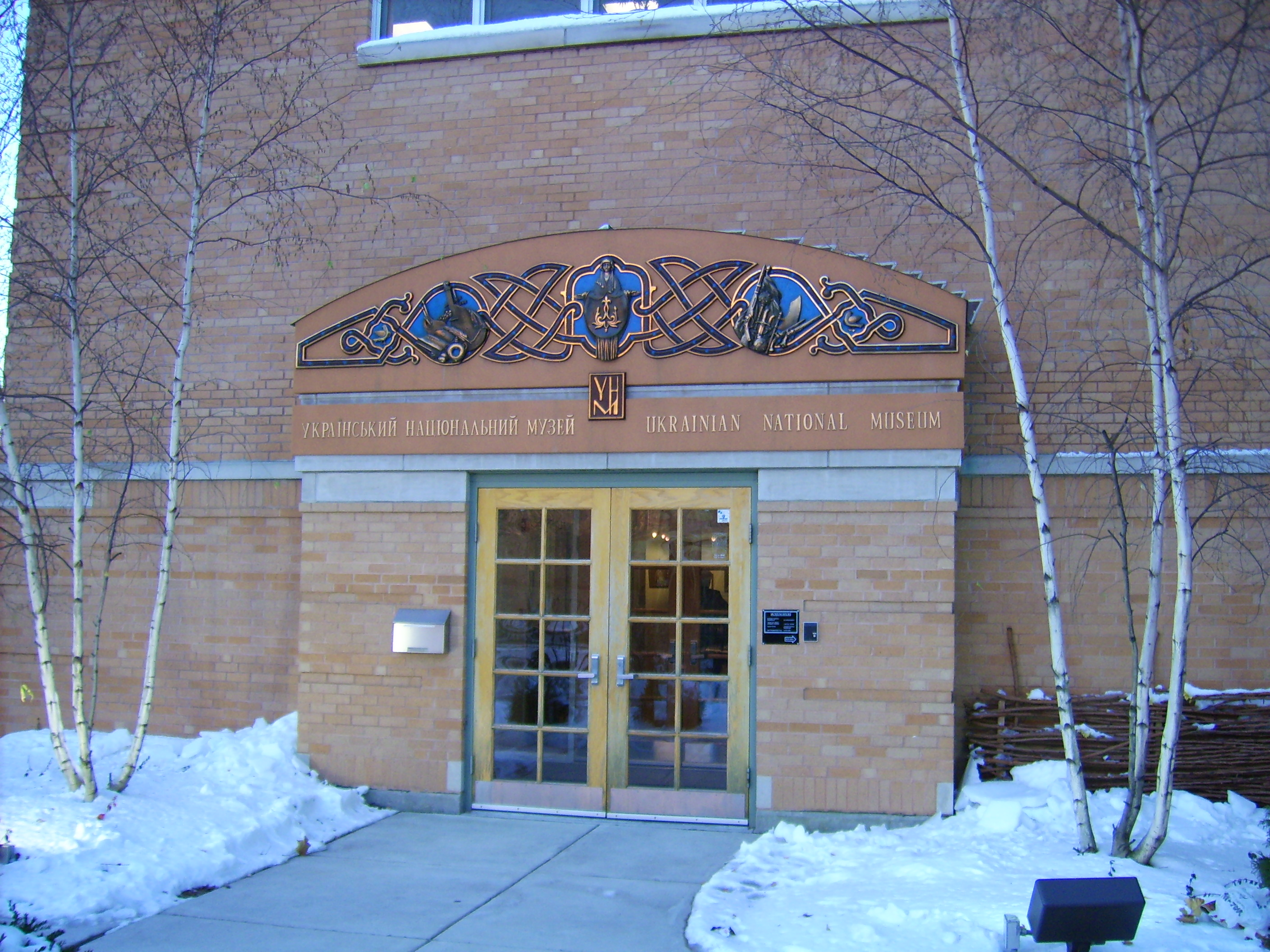
The Ukrainian National Museum

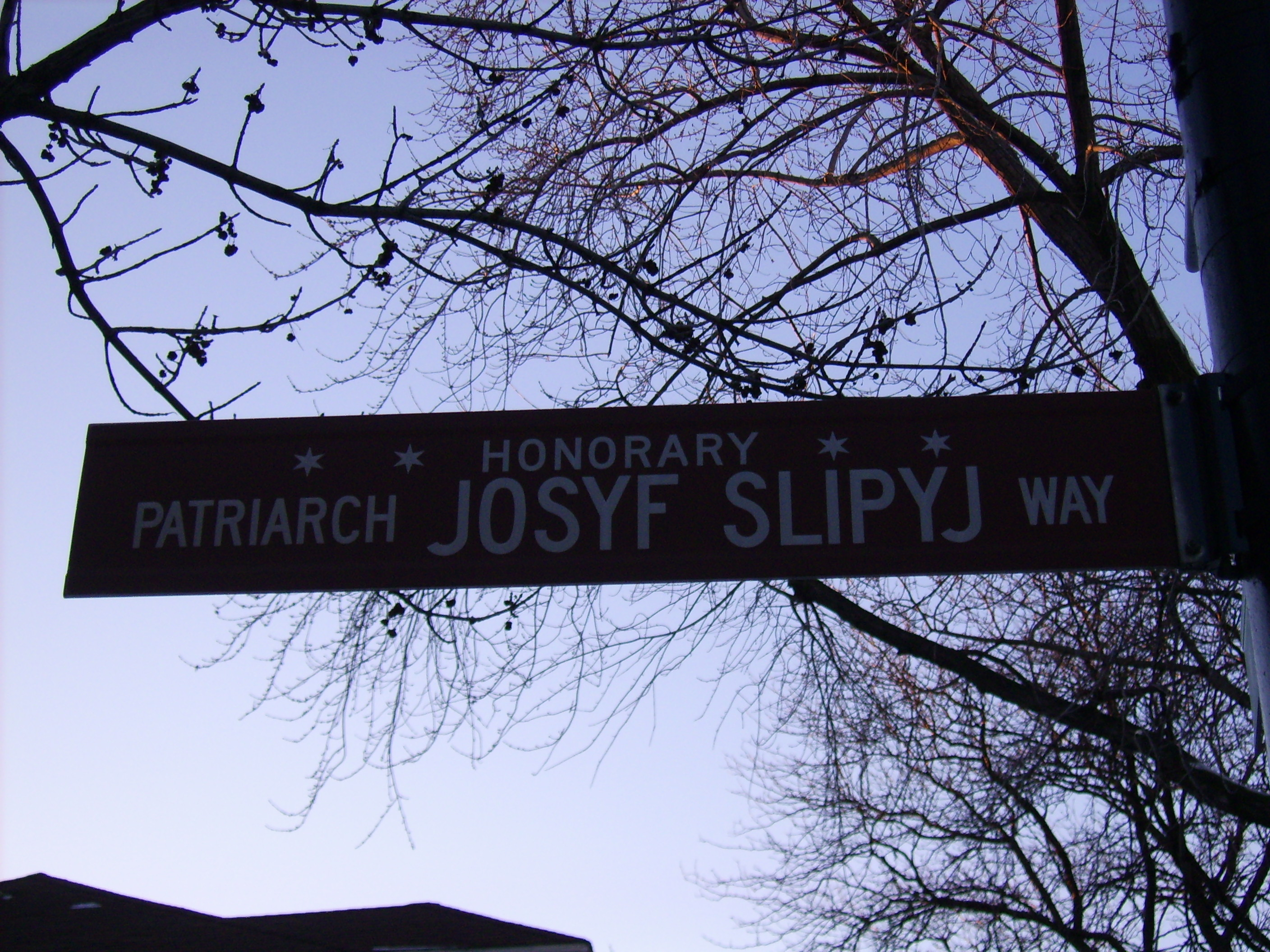
Street sign marking a street named after a famous Ukrainian religious leader

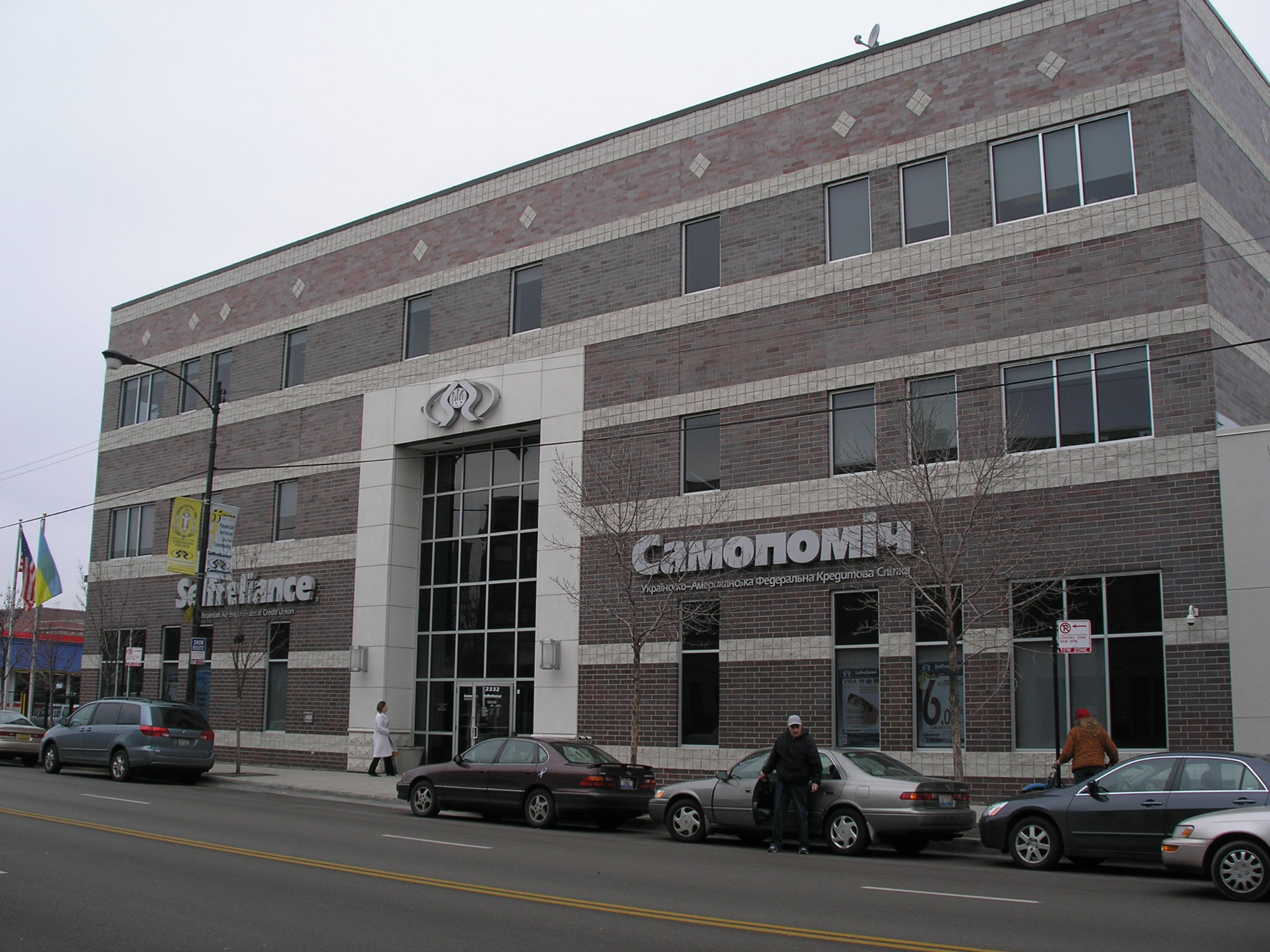
Selfreliance Credit Union (in Ukrainian Village, Chicago)

== See also ==
- Slavic Village in Cleveland, Ohio
