= Institute of Ecumenical Studies =

The Institute of Ecumenical Studies (IES) of the Ukrainian Catholic University in Lviv was established in 2004. The president is Iwan Dacko.

== Programs ==
Since 2006, the Master's Program in Ecumenical Studies has expanded to include several programs and competitions.

=== Journalism ===
In Spring 2009, IESorganized the first all-Ukrainian competition for journalists entitled Reporters in Hope in Ukraine. The program was inspired by the philosophy of French journalists in association with Reporters of Hope in France. The first Ukrainian competition received over 700 entries from every region in Ukraine. The second Reporters of Hope in Ukraine competition started in June 2010.

=== Medical-psychological and social support for people with special needs ===
In 2010, IES established a specialization in the medical-psychological and social support for people with special needs. Upon graduating, students of the program receive a diploma from the Lviv Polytechnic National University, UCU, and the International Federation L'Arche in addition to their Master's of Ecumenical Studies degree from UCU.

=== Distance master's program in ecumenical studies ===
In 2008, IED established the first ever Master's level theological ecumenical education through online instruction with the Distance Learning Master's Program in Ecumenical Studies. Study in this program takes place under the guidance of professors around the world.

== Social activities ==
IES has attempted to reach out to the community through several programs and events including the Ecumenical Social Week, Percentage Philanthropy, and the Initiative of Christians for Europe.

=== Ecumenical Social Week ===
The first ecumenical Social Week was organized in Lviv in June 2008 with the cooperation of the Ukrainian Catholic University, the Lviv City Council, the Lviv Regional Council, and the Regional State Administration. The Week was themed “Ukrainian Cooperation Movement”. Social organizations and representatives from religious, political, economic, and cultural spheres took part in the week's events. Attendees included Kateryna Yushchenko, Michael Camdessus, Jean Paul Veziant, Hans-Jurgen Heimsoeth, Bernard Chenevez, and Piotr Mazurkiewicz.

=== Percentage philanthropy ===
The Expert Committee of the ESW developed a legal bill "On Introducing Changes to Several Laws of Ukraine Regarding Support for Non-Profit Organizations". The law on percentage philanthropy would allow the taxpayer to transfer 2% of their income to a specific social organization. Ukrainian National Deputies S. Kurpil, P. Pysarchuk, and V. Stretovych supported the bill.

=== The Initiative of Christians for Europe ===
IES is a member of the Initiative of Christians for Europe (IXE). IXE is a network of Social Weeks, which take place in different parts of Europe. IES took part in the development of two declarations presented to the European Union: The declaration on the occasion of preparing for the 50th anniversary of the European Economic Union Treaty (2006) and the Appeal to the Citizens of Europe regarding the June 2009 elections of the European Parliament.
