= Ukrainian Village District =

Historic district in Chicago

Coordinates: 41.90134°N 87.68015°W

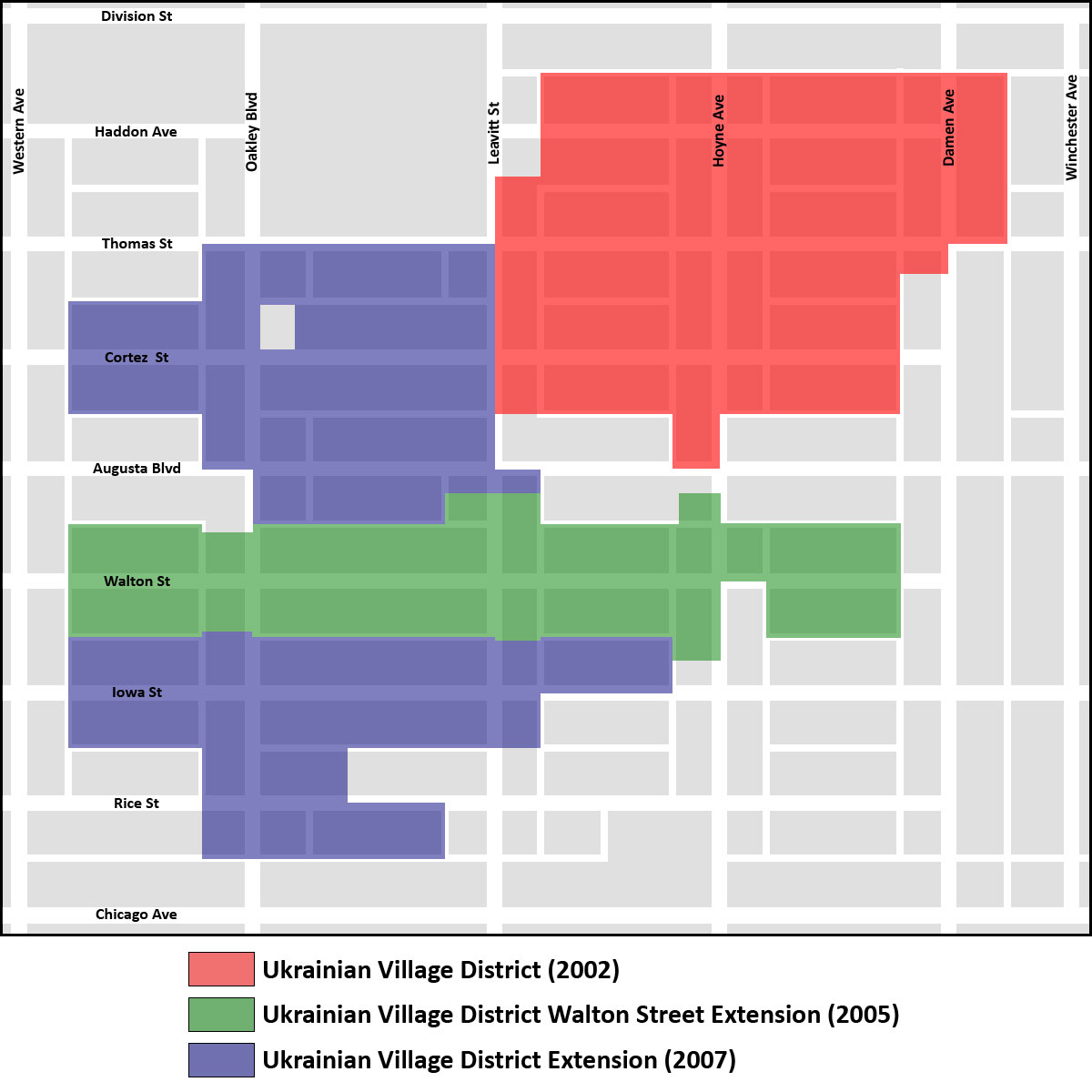
A map of the Ukrainian Village District.

The Ukrainian Village District is a landmark-designated district of residential buildings within the West Town community area of Chicago, Illinois. It was designated a Chicago Landmark in 2002, with area extensions in 2005 and 2007.

== Designated areas ==
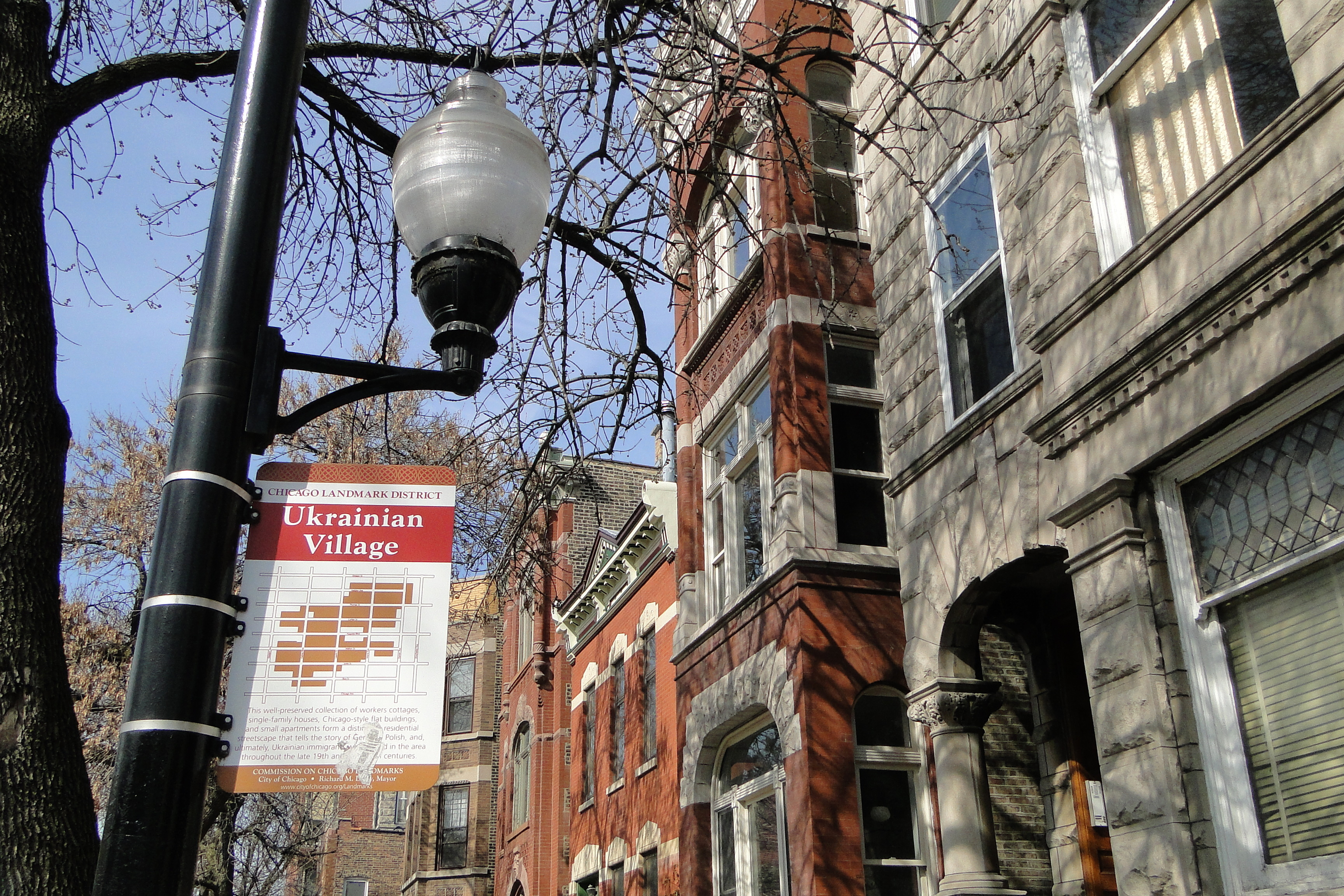
A street scene from Ukrainian Village, April 2011.

The Ukrainian Village District was designated on December 4, 2002, and comprised portions of Haddon Avenue, Thomas Street, and Cortez Street between Damen and Leavitt Avenues, including portions of Damen, Hoyne and Leavitt Avenues. The district encompasses the oldest part of the Ukrainian Village neighborhood, which was developed beginning in the 1880s and lasting into the 1920s. In 1886, near the corner of Haddon Street and Damen Avenue, a group of distinctive brick workers cottages were begun by William D. Kerfoot (the first real estate developer to reestablish his business after the Great Chicago Fire of 1871).

The Walton Street Extension was designated on July 27, 2005 as a four-block stretch of Walton Street between Damen and Western Avenues. It is representative of the second phase of Ukrainian Village development, from 1890 to 1905. It contains an uninterrupted collection of solidly built workers cottages, single-family homes, and two- and three-flat residential buildings. This extension was not contiguous with the original district.

A second Ukrainian Village District Extension was designated on April 11, 2007 with two distinct areas. The northerly part includes portions of Thomas Street, Cortez Street, and Augusta Boulevard between Leavitt Avenue and Oakley Boulevard, as well as Cortez from Oakley to Western, and Oakley between Thomas and Augusta. This area was divided into residential lots starting in 1905, and was built up with housing from 1910 to 1914. The southerly part includes Iowa Street from Hoyne to Western, Rice Street from Leavitt to Oakley, and Oakley from Walton to Rice. It was subdivided between 1908 and 1911, and built up with flats from 1910 to 1917.

With the 2007 extension, the original district and its two extensions were made contiguous. They are collectively known as the Ukrainian Village District. Notably, although the congregation of the Saint Nicholas Ukrainian Catholic Cathedral at 2238 West Rice Street consented to the proposed designation, the congregation of Saint Volodymyr Ukrainian Orthodox Cathedral at 2252–2258 West Cortez Street did not; as a result the church building at the northeast corner of Cortez and Oakley, constructed ca. 1911 as the Evangelical Lutheran St. Peters Congregational Church, was exempted from the district.
