= Zazdrist =

Zazdrist Заздрість
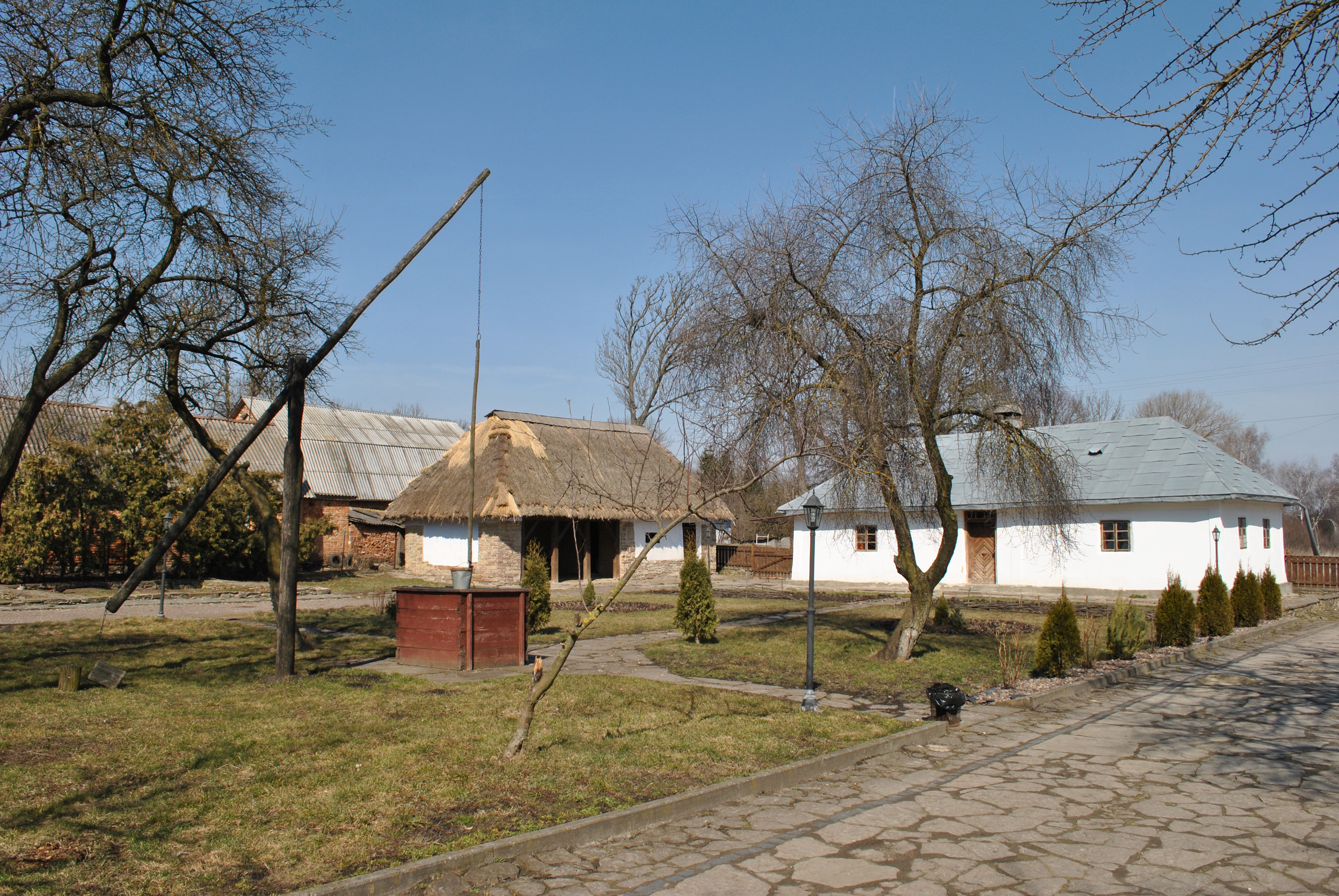
- A restored house on the territory of the Patriarch Josyf Slipyj's Native House Museum and Memorial Complex

- Location in Ternopil Oblast Zazdrist (Ternopil Oblast)
- Coordinates: 49°21′08″N 25°31′05″E
- Country: Ukraine
- Oblast: Ternopil Oblast
- Raion: Ternopil Raion
- Hromada: Mykulyntsi Hromada
- Postal code: 48125

Zazdrist (Ukrainian: Заздрість; Polish: Zazdrość) is a village in Ukraine, Ternopil Oblast, Ternopil Raion, Mykulyntsi settlement hromada.

== History ==
The first written mention of the village dates back to 1439.

After the liquidation of the Terebovlia Raion on 19 July 2020, the village became part of the Ternopil Raion.

== Religion ==
Archbishop Slipyj Spiritual Centre

- Exaltation of the Holy Cross church (1876, brick, OCU)
- Saint Joseph church (1911, rebuilt from a Roman Catholic church in 2007, UGCC)
- missionary village of the Basilian Sisters (1994, UGCC)

== People ==
- Josyf Slipyj (1892–1984), Major Archbishop of the Ukrainian Greek Catholic Church and a cardinal of the Catholic Church
