= Ukrainian Catholic University =

Private university in Lviv, Ukraine

- Український Католицький Університет
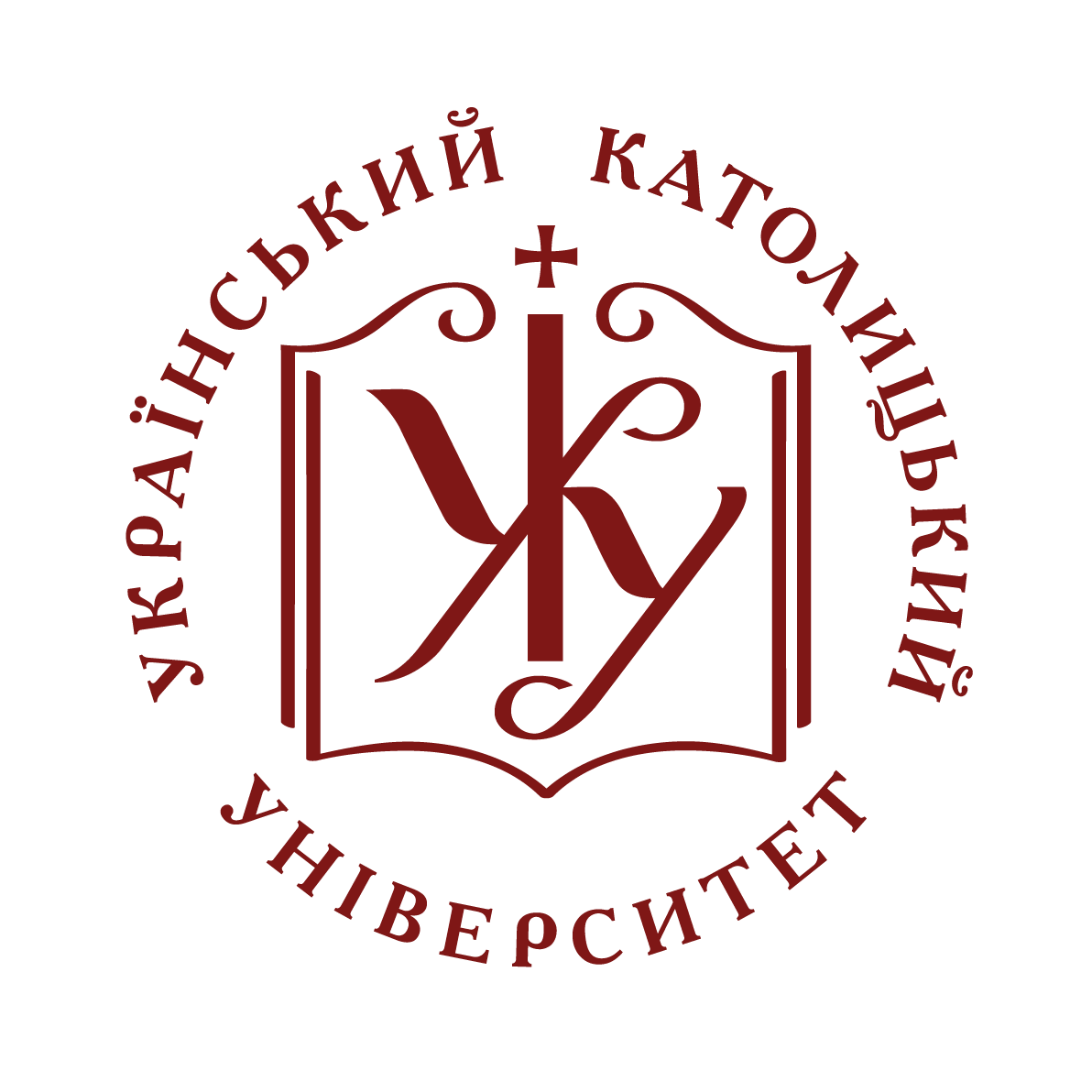
- Motto in English: Witness, Serve, Communicate
- Type: Private, Eastern Catholic
- Established: 6 October 1929; September 1994 (re-established)
- Accreditation: Ministry of Education and Science of Ukraine (since 2006)
- Chancellor: Major Archbishop Dr. Sviatoslav Shevchuk
- President: Bishop Dr. Borys Gudziak
- Rector: Dr. Taras Dobko
- Faculty: 300
- Students: 2,300
- Location: Lviv, Ukraine; 49°49′23″N 24°02′15″E
- Campus: Urban
- Website: www.ucu.edu.ua

The Ukrainian Catholic University (Ukrainian: Український католицький університет, romanized: Ukrainskyi katolytskyi universytet) is a Catholic university in Lviv, Ukraine, affiliated with the Ukrainian Greek Catholic Church. The Ukrainian Catholic University (UCU) was the first Catholic university to open on the territory of the former Soviet Union. The university frequently has the highest external independent evaluation scores of any Ukrainian university.

The Ukrainian Catholic University is the successor to the Greek Catholic Theological Academy, which was created in 1928 by metropolitan Andrey Sheptytsky in the city of Lviv, then under the Second Polish Republic. The academy's first rector was Josyf Slipyj. In 1994, the original school was recreated under the name of the Lviv Theological Academy, and on 28 June 2002, the Ukrainian Catholic University was formally refounded.

== History ==
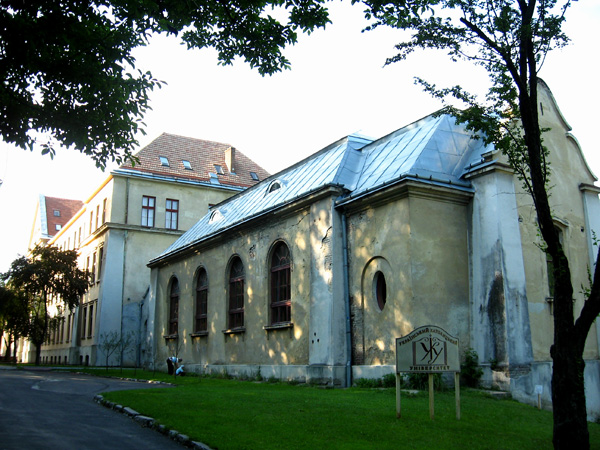
Old building of the university

=== Greek Catholic Theological Academy, 1929-1945 ===
On 6 October 1929, the Greek Catholic Theological Academy was founded in Lviv. Under the guidance of rector Josyf Slipyj, the Academy became the center for theological and philosophical studies almost overnight.

At the time, predominantly Ukrainian-populated Eastern Galicia was under the control of interwar Poland, and the Ukrainian Greek Catholic Church attained a strong Ukrainian national character. Since the Polish authorities did not allow the creation of a secular Ukrainian university, as that would have impeded their Polonization policies, the Academy became the sole Ukrainian institution of higher education on the territory of the Second Polish Republic. For the next ten years, the Academy continued to grow and expand by opening new departments, enlarging its library, and increasing its publishing capacity.

In September 1939, when Eastern Galicia fell under the Soviet control, the Theological Academy was closed and its students arrested or deported. On 15 September 1941, shortly after the onset of Operation Barbarossa, the Academy's Church of the Holy Spirit and the library were ruined by German bombings. Limited studies resumed under German occupation. Out of 500 students who studied at the Academy between 1941–1944, only 60 received diplomas.

After the Lvov-Sandomierz Offensive resulted in the Soviet recapture of Lviv in the spring of 1945, the Theological Academy was closed. This time, the closure would last for decades, and many of its graduates and professors ended up in the Gulag system of prison camps. Soon after the war's conclusion, at the Soviet-organised March 1946 Synod of Lviv, the Ukrainian Greek Catholic Church was united with the recently recreated Ukrainian exarchate of the Russian Orthodox Church. Catholic theological education was restricted to the underground, as well as the entire UGCC church as a whole, as the church had been banned.

=== Lviv Theological Academy, 1994-2002 ===
A new chapter in UCU history began after Ukraine attained its independence in the wake of the 1991 dissolution of the Soviet Union. In September 1994, the Lviv Theological Academy (LTA) was opened. In 1998 the LTA was recognized by the Congregation for Catholic Education.

The first graduation took place in the summer of 1999, with twenty-eight graduates receiving their degrees. This marked a significant milestone for the school as well as for theological education in Ukraine in general. For the first time: laity received a Bachelor of Arts degree from a Ukrainian theological school at a post-secondary level; women in Ukraine received a degree in theology.

=== Ukrainian Catholic University, 2002-present ===
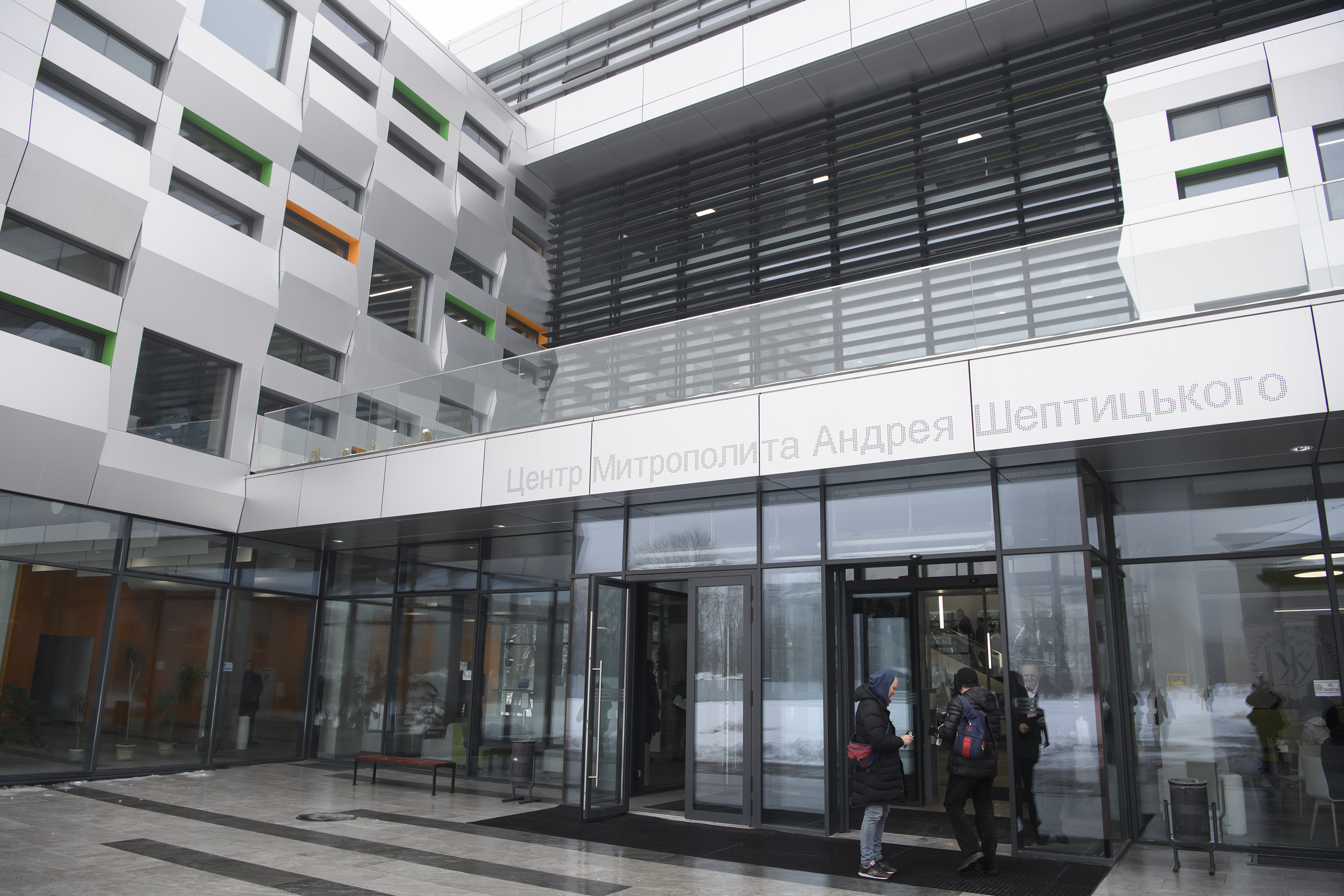
Andrey Sheptytsky Centre

The UCU came into existence on the foundation prepared for it by the Lviv Theological Academy. On his visit to Ukraine on 26 June 2001, Pope John Paul II blessed the future university's cornerstone. The ceremonial inauguration honoring its founding took place on 29 June 2002. It was the first university opened by one of the Eastern Catholic Churches, rather than by a religious order.

The founding is seen by the university community as a culmination of efforts by the UGCC and Ukrainian academics to create an educational institution, which would grow on the foundation of "Christian spirituality, culture and worldview".

"I consider this project one of the most successful in the field of Ukrainian education", said Vyacheslav Bryukhovetskyy, President of the National University of Kyiv-Mohyla Academy, after the establishment of the Lviv Theological Academy and its subsequent transformation into the Ukrainian Catholic University. The Rector Rev. Borys Gudziak expressed his hope that UCU would be a center for cultural thought and the formation of the new Ukrainian society based on human dignity.

In cooperation with the Institute of Religion and Society of Ukraine, the Ukrainian Catholic University established and runs the Religious Information Service of Ukraine with a multilingual Web Portal. In 2004, the Institute of Ecumenical Studies was established.

== Faculties ==
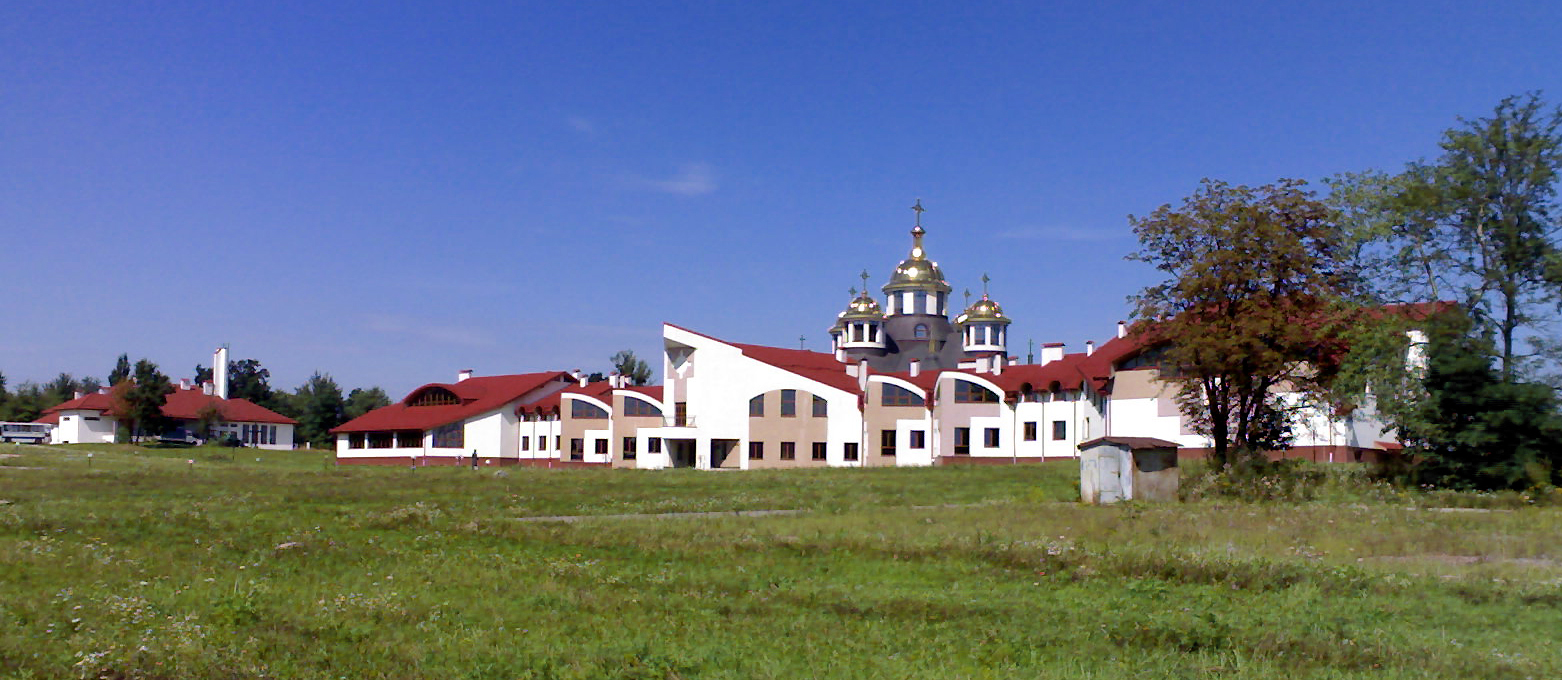
University campus in Sykhiv district

- Law
- Sociology
- Computer Science
- IT and business analytics
- Artes Liberales
- Theology
- Ethics Politics Economics
- Social work
- Psychology

UCU is the first Catholic university on post-Soviet territory and the leading independent university in Ukraine. In 2018, UCU’s entrants had the top average standardized test score among all institutions of higher education in Ukraine. The Sheptytsky Center was named “Face of the City of Lviv” in 2017. In 2017, UCU was included in the book “The 10 Most Successful Ukrainian Brands,” a list of the best companies and organizations in Ukraine that set the pace in their various fields.

== Foundations and affiliates ==
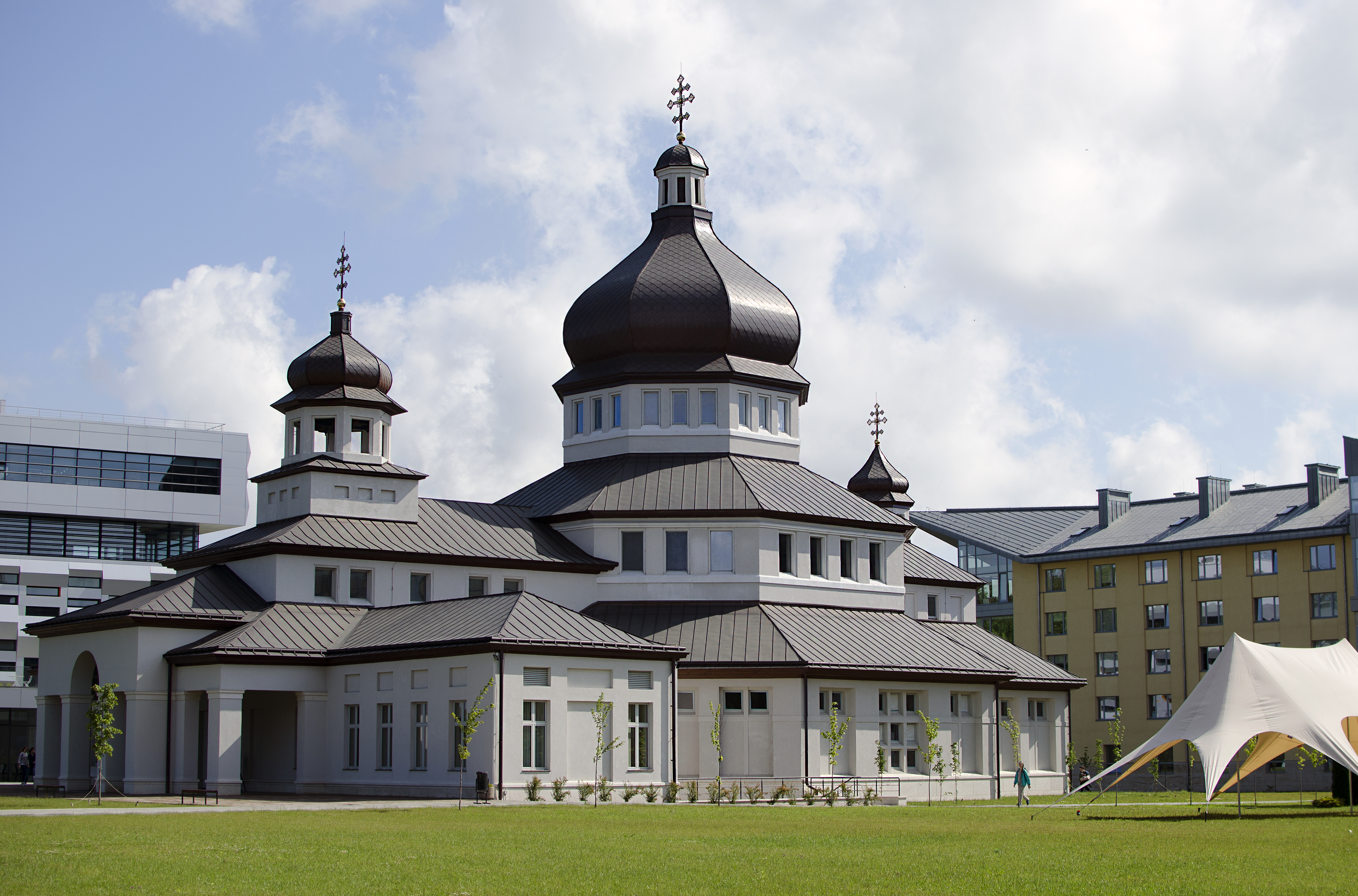
University Church of St. Sophia

- UCU Kyiv Centre
- Ukrainian Catholic Education Foundation – USA
- The Institute of Pope Clement in Rome
- The Ukrainian Institute in London
- Ukrainian Catholic Education Foundation – Canada
- Patriarch Josyf Slipyj Institute of Ukrainian Culture, UCU’s branch in Argentina

=== UCU Entrepreneurship Center ===
In April 2020, the UCU Entrepreneurship Center signed a memorandum of cooperation with the Ukrainian Startup Fund.

== Notable personalities ==
Honorary doctors of UCU

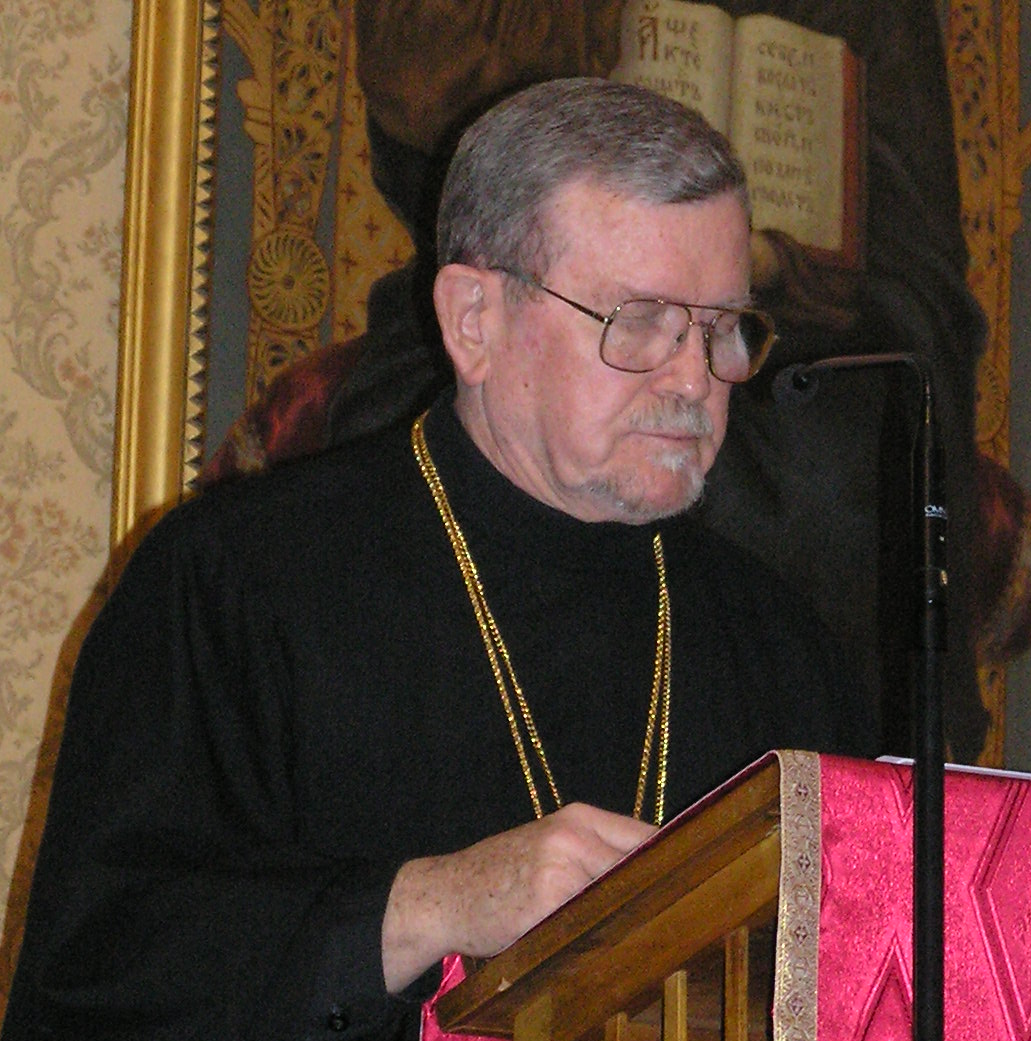
Robert F. Taft

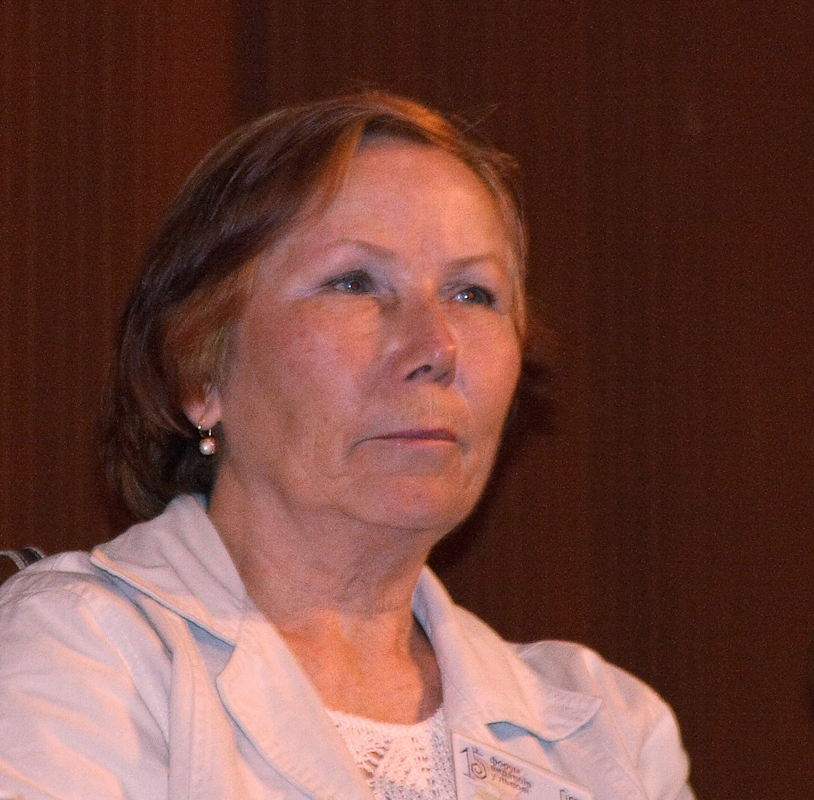
Natalia Yakovenko

- Yulian Voronovskyi, bishop of the Ukrainian Greek Catholic Church
- Martha Bohachevsky-Chomiak, Ukrainian American historian
- George Weigel, American philosopher and theologian
- Ivan Muzychka, Ukrainian theologian active in Rome
- Mykhailo Vasylyk, Ukrainian Argentine economist
- Robert F. Taft, Jesuit theologian
- A. James McAdams, American political scientist and historian
- Franciszek Greniuk, Polish Roman Catholic theologian
- Zenia Kushpeta, Ukrainian Canadian civic activist and musician
- Vira Andrushkiv, Ukrainian American pedagogue and philanthropist
- Natalia Yakovenko, Ukrainian historian
- Volodymyr Pylypovych, publisher and civic activist of the Ukrainian diaspora in Poland
- Mykhailo Yarymovych, Ukrainian American scientist and inventor
- Ihor Isichenko, Ukrainian philologist and priest
- Janusz Czerski, Polish-Ukrainian Bible scientist
- Iryna Galadza, catechite and civic activist active in Canada
- John I. Jenkins, American Catholic priest, theologian and educator
- Adrian Slywotzky, Ukrainian American economist
