= Josyf Slipyj =

Head of the Ukrainian Greek Catholic Church from 1944 to 1984

His Eminent Beatitude Josyf Slipyi
- Cardinal, Metropolitan of Galicia; Major Archbishop of Lviv
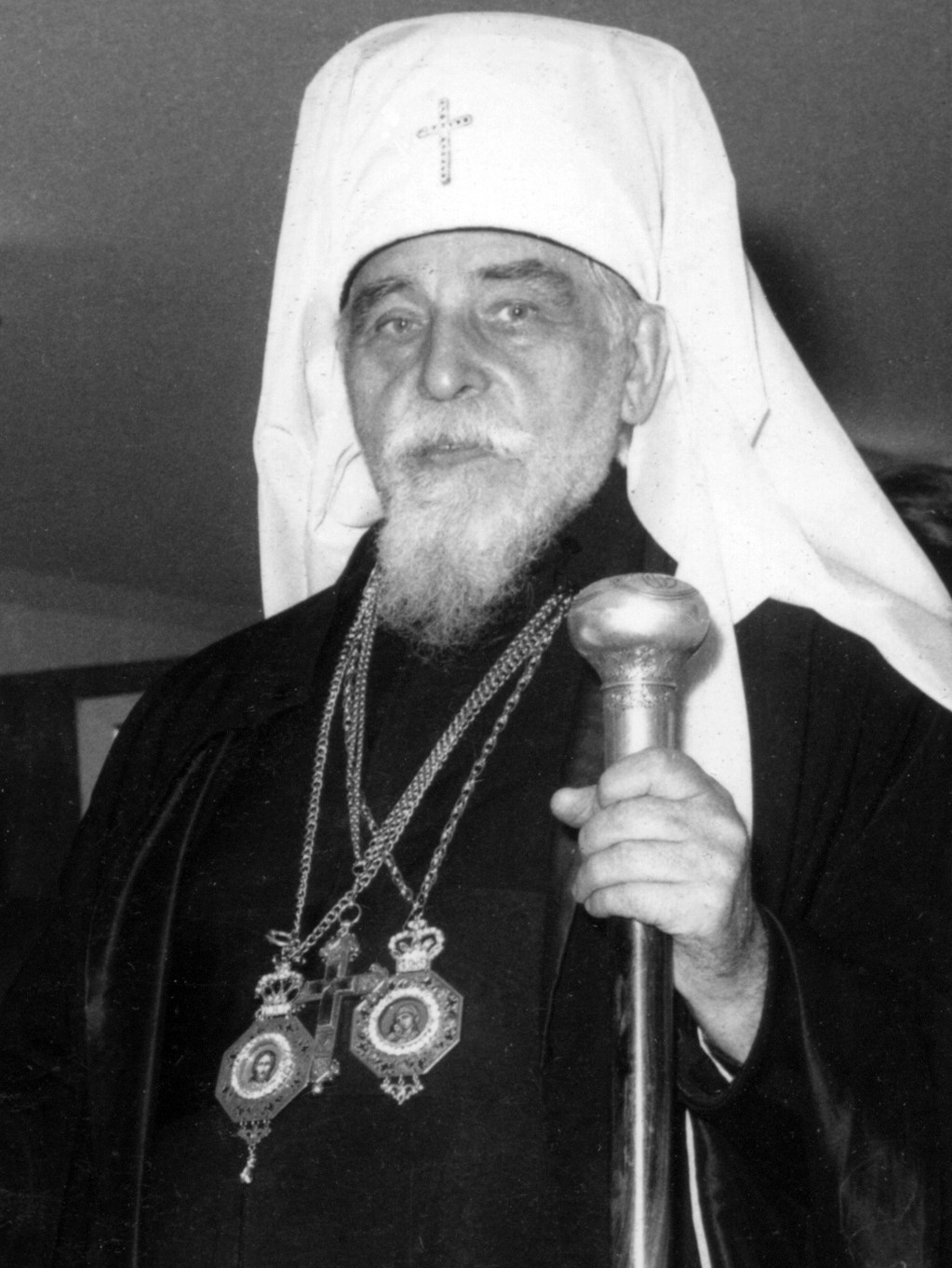
- Cardinal Slipyi in Australia in 1968
- Church: Ukrainian Greek Catholic Church
- Appointed: 1 November 1944
- Installed: never (Note: He was never installed due to the Soviet prosecutions against the Ukrainian Greek Catholic Church)
- Term ended: 7 September 1984
- Predecessor: Andrey Sheptytsky
- Successor: Myroslav Lubachivsky

Orders
- Ordination: 30 September 1917 (Priest) by Andrey Sheptytsky
- Consecration: 22 December 1939 (Bishop) by Andrey Sheptytsky
- Created cardinal: 22 February 1965 by Pope Paul VI

Personal details
- Born: Йосип Сліпий; 17 February 1892 Zazdrist, Kingdom of Galicia and Lodomeria, Austria-Hungary (now Ukraine)
- Died: 7 September 1984 (aged 92) Rome, Italy
- Buried: St. George's Cathedral, Lviv; 49°50′19.48″N 24°0′46.19″E
- Denomination: Catholicism
- Motto: Per aspera ad astra
- Coat of arms

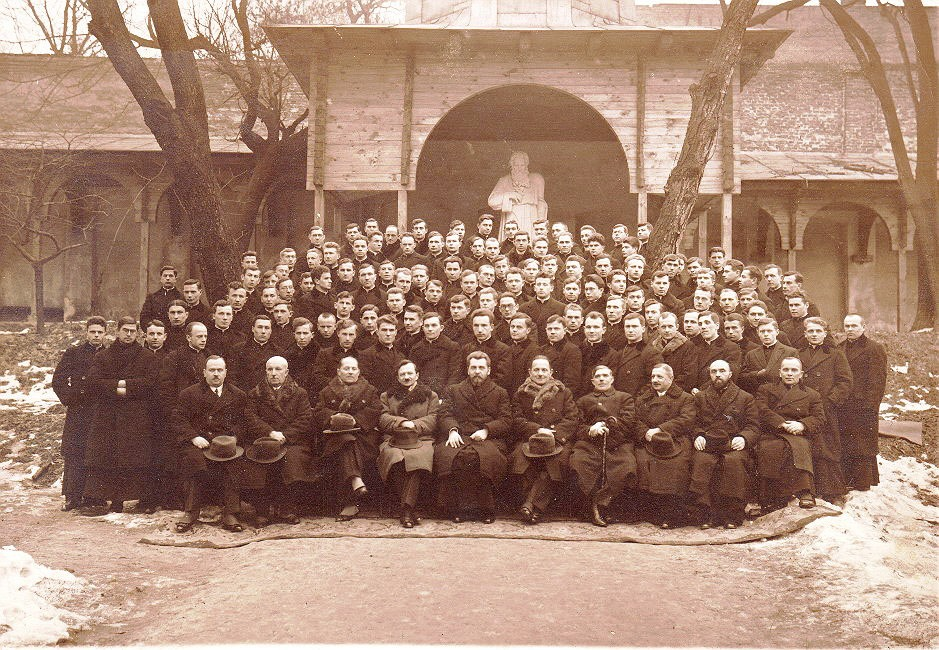
Rector of the Theological Academy Fr. Josyf Slipyi in the company of teachers and students of this Academy. In 1936.

Josyf Slipyi (Ukrainian: Йосиф Сліпий, born as Ukrainian: Йосиф Коберницький-Дичковський, romanized: Yosyf Kobernyts'kyy-Dychkovs'kyy; 17 February 1892 – 7 September 1984) was a Major Archbishop of the Ukrainian Greek Catholic Church and a cardinal of the Catholic Church.

== Life ==
=== Genealogy ===
Josyf Slipyj's father, Joannes (Ivan) Slipyj, was born 17 February 1892 in Zazdrist (Polish: Zazdrość) into a family of local Ukrainian farmers. His mother was Anastasia Dychkovska (born 27 January 1850), the daughter of Roman Dychkovski and Barbara Janisiewicz, also from Zazdrist. Both clans were well rooted in the village and can be traced there as far back as existing records allow. Interestingly, but not uncommon, one of Cardinal Josyf's great grandfathers, Adalberti Slominski, was of the Roman Catholic (Latin) rite. Cardinal Slipyj's older sister, Francisca, was also baptized in the Latin rite by Rev. Martinus Serwacki on 17 February 1875. At the time the family was living at house #75, Zazdrist.

=== Early years ===
Josyf Slipyj was born in the village of Zazdrist (Terebovlia povit), Galicia (in modern Ternopil Oblast), then a crownland of Austria-Hungary. Unlike most Ukrainian Catholic priests at the time, Josyf Slipy did not come from a sacerdotal family, which was considered an elite, educated caste among Ukrainians, but had common roots instead. As a teen Josyf studied at the gymnasium in Ternopil and then at the Lviv Greek-Catholic Seminary and Innsbruck University in Austria, before being ordained a priest on 30 June 1917. From 1920 to 1922, he studied in Rome at the Pontifical Oriental Institute, the Collegio Angelico (Pontifical University of St. Thomas Aquinas, Angelicum), and the Pontifical Gregorian University. He returned to Lwów (Lviv), by then part of Second Polish Republic.

After a short pastoral assignment, Slipyi in 1922 became a professor of dogmatic theology at the Lviv Holy Spirit Seminary. In 1926 he became the rector of the seminary and actively participated in its development. In 1923, he established the Theological Academic Society, for which he wrote the articles of association and enrolled scholars. In the same year, he became an editor of the quarterly Bohosloviia (Богословія, Theology). On 14 April 1929 Slipyi became the first rector of the Lviv Theological Academy (the predecessor to the Ukrainian Catholic University).

In 1926, Slipyj became a member of the supervisory board of the Lviv National Museum, and in 1931 Deputy Chairman of the Ukrainian Catholic Union. Due to his scholarly merits and active development of Ukrainian cultural and religious life, Slipyi became a member of the Shevchenko Scientific Society. At this time, he made numerous research trips to Western Europe and the Holy Land; took part in union congresses in Velegrad, Prague, and Pinsk; and in 1936 organized a union congress in Lviv.

=== Soviet and Nazi occupation ===
On 22 December 1939, with the blessing of Pope Pius XII, Slipyj was ordained archbishop of Serrae and Coadjutor Archbishop of Lviv with the right of succession. The ordination was conducted by Metropolitan Andrey Sheptytsky in secrecy due to the Soviet presence and the political situation.

Metropolitan Andrey reorganized the Eastern Catholic hierarchy within the Soviet Union, and on 9 October 1939, he named Slipyj the Ukrainian Catholic Apostolic Exarch of Great Ukraine. He did so on his own authority because there was limited contact with the Holy See, and it was not until December 1941 that he received a letter from the Vatican recognizing his appointments for the Soviet territory.

On 30 June 1941, Slipyj supported the Act of restoration of the Ukrainian state. He became the head of the Ukrainian Greek Catholic Church on 1 November 1944, following Sheptytsky's death.

After Soviet troops captured Lviv, Slipyj was arrested along with other bishops in 1945 by the NKVD and convicted to penal servitude, allegedly for collaboration with the Nazi regime. That was the first step in the planned liquidation of the Ukrainian Greek Catholic Church by Soviet authorities. After being jailed in Lviv, Kyiv, and Moscow, he was sentenced by a Soviet court to eight years of hard labor in the Siberian Gulag.

At this time Soviet authorities forcibly convened an assembly of 216 priests, and on 9 March 1946 and the following day, the so-called "Synod of Lviv" was held in St. George's Cathedral. The Union of Brest, the council at which the Ukrainian Greek Catholic Church formally entered into ecclesiastic communion with the Holy See, was revoked. The Church was forcibly "rejoined" to the Russian Orthodox Church.

Slipyj rejected any offers of conversion into Orthodoxy and was sentenced serially in 1953, 1957, 1962, thus being imprisoned for a total of 18 years in camps in Siberia and Mordovia (Dubravlag in Potma). Slipyj spent five years in Maklakovo (Krasnoyarsk region), where he wrote a multi-volume history of the Catholic Church in Ukraine.

According to Mykola Posivnych, Josyf Slipyj saw his imprisonment years as lost years. He was devastated since the best years of his life in terms of productivity, Slipyj had to spend among criminals, investigators, and jailers. Numerous times he went through illnesses as well as having his legs and hands broken and frostbitten.

Slipyj's prison writings managed to circulate. In 1957 Pope Pius XII sent him a congratulatory letter on the 40th anniversary of his ordination to the priesthood. It was confiscated, and also on account of his circulating writings, he was sentenced to seven more years in prison.

=== Release to Rome and honors from the Vatican ===
On 23 January 1963, he was freed by Nikita Khrushchev's administration after political pressure from Pope John XXIII and United States President John F. Kennedy. He arrived in Rome on 9 February 1963 in time to participate in the Second Vatican Council.

For the first time in 17 years, the splendidly robed archbishop fully celebrated the Eucharist in the high Slavonic rite. Willebrands, Arrighi and I witnessed the tears of the archbishop, the tears of the monks and the tears of each other.

— Thomas F. Stransky, Vatican II: Recollections of an Insider

Beginning in 1963 many Ukrainian bishops lobbied for Slipyj to be named patriarch, but Pope Paul VI refused, instead creating the new office of major archbishop and appointing Slipyj as its first incumbent on 23 December 1963.

Styles of Josyf Slipyj
- Reference style: His Eminence
- Spoken style: Your Eminence
- Informal style: Cardinal
- See: Kyiv and Halych

In 1949 Slipyj had been secretly (in pectore) named a cardinal by Pope Pius XII, but this would have expired in 1958 when that pope died.

On 25 January 1965 Pope Paul VI named Slipyj a cardinal and appointed him Cardinal-Priest of Sant'Atanasio. At the time he was the 4th cardinal in Ukrainian Greek-Catholic Church history. He was given a red koukoulion at the consistory as well as a galero.

Because he was major archbishop (not patriarch), he was cardinal priest instead of being in the then-new rank of cardinal patriarch. His successors in Ukraine, whether cardinals or not, have used the title of major archbishop.

He did not participate in the 1978 papal conclaves in August and October, being past the age of 80 then.

On the first occasion of an audience with Pope John Paul II, the Pope greeted Cardinal Slipyj first, which was contrary to protocol.

=== Reorganization of UGCC life ===
From the start of his arrival in Rome the Major Archbishop strove to organize the self-management of the local Ukrainian Catholic Church, headed by the patriarch. This idea was not supported by the Apostolic See.

In 1968, 1970, 1973 and 1976 Cardinal Slipyj visited countries in Europe, America, Asia and Australia in order to strengthen the ties with the Ukrainian diaspora overseas, and to reinvigorate the religious life of the Ukrainian Greek Catholic Church abroad. During these years he also took part in three international Eucharistic Congresses (Bombay, Bogota, Melbourne).

In 1977, Slipyj consecrated Ivan Choma, Stefan Czmil and Lubomyr Husar as bishops without approval of the pope. These consecrations caused much annoyance to the Roman Curia as episcopal consecrations without papal permission were considered illicit in the Canon Law in force at the time.

As a Major Archbishop with Patriarchal rights, Slipyj gathered a number of synods of the Ukrainian Greek Catholic Church. The most significant ones took place in 1969, 1971 and 1973. During the last Synod, the constitution of the UGCC patriarchal arrangement was adopted. Slipyj published his ordinances in "Evangelicum of the Major Archbishop of the Byzantine-Ukrainian rite" starting from 1964.

In Rome, he bought and rebuilt church of Saints Sergius and Bacchus for Ukrainian Catholics. On the territory of church both museum and hostel were founded. In 1967–1968, the church of Santa Sofia on Via Boccea was built in Rome at his orders.

In 1960 he revitalized the Ukrainian Theological Scientific Society in exile and restored the publishing of "Bohoslovia" (Theology) in 1963 and the journal "Dzvony" (Дзвони, Bells) in 1976.

In 1963 Slipyj organized the Ukrainian Catholic University of St. Clement with an academic publishing house.

=== Death and burial ===
Although Slipyj was banned from entering Ukraine by the leaders of the USSR, including Nikita Khrushchev, nevertheless he refused to give up his Soviet passport.

He died in Rome on 7 September 1984. His body lay in state at the church of Santa Sofia on Via Boccea; Pope John Paul II visited to pay his respects. After the dissolution of the Soviet Union, his relics were returned to St. George's Cathedral in Lviv, and were reburied there on 27–29 August 1992.

His cause for canonisation has been introduced at Rome.

== Intellectual interests ==
In his research work he concentrated on approximating the scholasticism of Saint Thomas Aquinas to the requirements of Eastern Theology. Slipyj wrote a number of dogmatic works on the importance of the Holy Trinity, the origin of the Holy Spirit and Holy Sacraments, among which are:

- Die Trinitätslehre des byzantinischen Patriarchen Photios, 1921
- De principio spirationis in SS. Trinitate, 1926
- On the Holy Sacrament, 1953
- Die Auffassung des Lebens nach dem Evangelium und I.Briefe des Hl. Johannes, 1965

He also covered historical and ecumenical topics.

In 1968-1976 all of Josyf Slipyj's works were gathered and published as a work of the Ukrainian Catholic University in Rome (Volume I-VIII) with the title Opera omnia Kyr Josephi (Slipyj – Kobernyckyj – Dyčkovskyj) Archiepiscopi Maioris et Cardinalis / Твори кир Йосифа Верховного архиєпископа і кардинала (Universitas Catholica Ucrainorum Sancti Clementis Papae).

== Honors, commemoration and monuments ==
=== Honors ===
- Honorable member of Shevchenko Scientific Society (1964)
- Member of Accademia Tiberina in Rome (1965)
- Honorary doctorate of Ukrainian Free University in Munich (1969)
- Commemorative coin with denomination of ₴2 of the National Bank of Ukraine, dedicated to Josyf Slipyj

=== Monuments and commemorative tablets ===
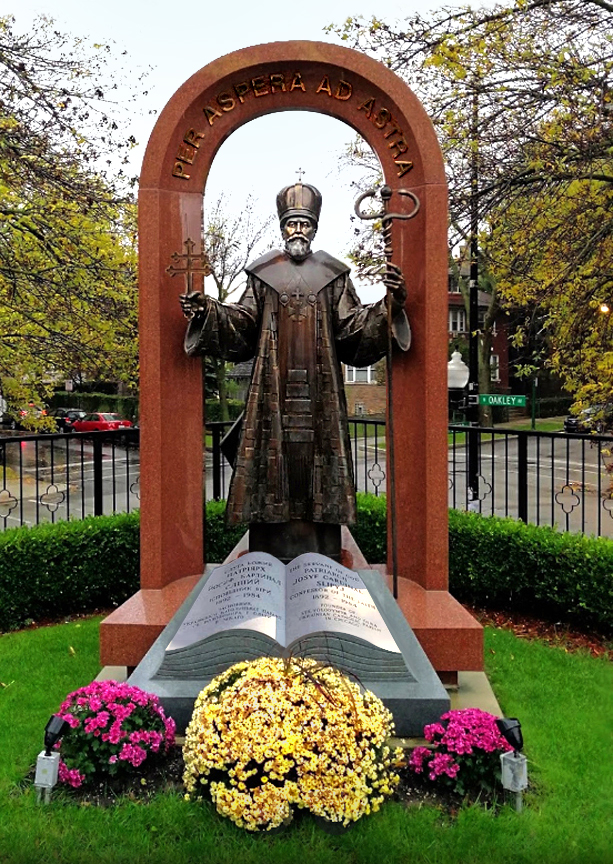
- Monument of Patriarch Josyf Cardinal Slipyj, at Sts. Volodymyr and Olha Ukrainian Catholic Church, Chicago, Illinois. Sculpted by Yevgeniy Prokopov.

In honor of the 40th anniversary of Sts. Volodymyr and Olha Ukrainian Catholic Church in Chicago, founded in 1969 by Josyf Slipyj, a monument of Cardinal Josyf Slipyj was unveiled and blessed on November 22, 2009. The monument was created by sculptor Yevgeniy Prokopov.

- Three other plaques near the entrance at Sts. Volodymyr and Olha commemorate Josyf Slipyj. Two are about his 1973 and 1976 visits to the church, and a third is about his consecration of the new church during the archbishops' synod in Rome in 1971.
- In honor of Josyf Slipyj’s 100th birthday, a monument (1992) and a commemorative bust (1994) were installed in his home village Zazdrist.
- In 2004 a monument dedicated to Slipyj was installed in front of the UGCC Cathedral in Ternopil. On the opening day His Beatitude Lubomyr Husar unveiled and blessed the monument.
- The bas-relief with commemorative tablet was installed on the side wall of the Lviv Central Post Office on Copernicus Street in Lviv.
- A commemorative tablet was installed in 2005 in Kharkiv. In 2010 it was dismantled on the order of the local council, only to be re-installed in 2011.

=== Museums ===
- A museum dedicated to Josyf Slipyj was opened on the premises of Lviv Theological Academy (now UCU) in 1997.
- Patriarch Josyf Slipyj "Hometown" memorial museum complex was opened in 1998 in the place of his birth, the village Zazdrist.

=== Institutions ===
- Both Ternopil Seminary in the town of Velyka Berezovytsia and Ternopil municipal Collegium were named after Patriarch Josyf Slipyj.
- Toronto Catholic District School Board has an elementary school, named after him in Etobicoke. Opened in September 1985 and located in the West Deane Park building since 1990.

=== Streets ===
A number of Ukrainian cities' streets hold the name of Patriarch Josyf Slipyj (Lviv, Ternopil, Ivano-Frankivsk, Kolomyia).

=== Commemorative events ===
The year 2002 was dedicated by the UGCC to the commemoration of the 110th anniversary of Josyf Slipyj birth. On this occasion in July a pilgrimage to Zarvanytsia took place, with pilgrims coming from various parts of Ukraine, Canada, the US, altogether more than 200.000.

On 22 March 2012, the Ukrainian parliament issued an order to commemorate the 120th anniversary of Josyf Slipyj’s birth. The parliament suggested that the government establish an organizational committee that would develop a program of events to honor the anniversary on the state-wide level. The parliament also proposed to republish Josyf Slipyj’s works, organize a conference in Kyiv on the topic "Patriarch Josyf Slipyj’s role in Ukrainian state creation and the formation of national identity of Ukrainian people", and initiate measures to preserve and restore objects related to Slipyj activities. The National Bank of Ukraine was ordered to issue a commemorative coin from the series "Prominent Ukrainians" with Slipyj’s depiction. The Ukrainian Postal Service "Ukrposhta" was ordered to print envelopes and postage stamps with Slipyj’s portrait.

To commemorate the 125th anniversary of birth of Major Archbishop of Ukrainian Greek Catholic Church and long-sentenced political prisoner of Soviet concentration camps, Lviv regional council dedicated the year 2017 to Josyf Slipyj.

== The Shoes of the Fisherman ==
It seems likely that Slipyj's life story was known to the Australian writer Morris West, who used it in his 1963 novel The Shoes of the Fisherman. West's protagonist is Kiril Pavlovich Lakota, the Metropolitan Archbishop of Lviv, who is freed by the Soviet Premier after 17 years in a Siberian labor camp. He is sent to Rome, where an elderly pope makes him a cardinal. The Pontiff dies, and Lakota finds himself elected Pope, taking the name Kiril I (a rare modern use of a baptismal name as a papal name).

Despite the similarities, it is not clear to what extent West used Slipyj or Bishop Hryhorij Lakota (who died in 1950 in the gulag) as a particular model for his character. The book begins with a disclaimer: "This is a book set in a fictional time, peopled with fictional characters, and no reference is intended to any living person, whether in the Church or out of it". According to the publisher, The Shoes of the Fisherman was written between March 1961 and August 1962, which is before Slipyj's release.

The novelty of a Ukrainian pope in a post-Cuban Missile Crisis, Cold War world led to the book being featured on The New York Times Best Seller list. It was the number 1 bestseller of the entire year on the Publishers Weekly fiction list, and the parallels led to increased fame for Slipyj.

Hollywood's film version appeared in 1968, starring Anthony Quinn as Lakota/Kiril I and Laurence Olivier as the (fictional) USSR Premier Piotr Ilyich Kamenev (and Lakota's jailer). It was nominated for two Academy Awards.

Some today regard The Shoes of the Fisherman as prophetic because it preceded by 15 years the election of Karol Józef Wojtyła as Pope John Paul II, the first Slavic pope as well as one from a Communist nation, noting even the Kiril/Karol similarity of names.

In 2019 the novel was published in Ukrainian with illustrations using Slipyj's likeness to depict Lakota/Pope Kiril.

== Notes ==
Religious titles
Preceded by Andrey Sheptytsky	Archbishop of Lviv (as Locum tenens of metropolitan see); 1944–1963	Title elevated
Preceded by Andrey Sheptytsky	Archbishop of Lviv (as Locum tenens of metropolitan see); 1944–1963	Succeeded by Vasyl Velychkovsky as Locum tenens of metropolitan see
New title	Major Archbishop of Lviv (exiled to Vatican); 1963–1984	Succeeded by Myroslav-Ivan Lubachivsky
Catholic Church titles
Preceded by Gabriel Acacius Coussa	Cardinal Priest of Sant'Atanasio; 25 January 1965 – 7 September 1984	Succeeded by Lucian Mureșan
