= Syrian Social Nationalist Party =

Syrian nationalist political party

Syrian Social Nationalist Party الحزب السوري القومي الاجتماعي
- President: Ali Haidar (Syrian Social Nationalist Party – Intifada Wing) Assaad Hardan (Hardan's faction) Rabi Noureddine Banat (Banat's faction)
- Founder: Antoun Saadeh
- Founded: 16 November 1931
- Banned: 29 January 2025 (in Syria)
- Armed wing: Eagles of the Whirlwind
- Ideology: Fascism; Social nationalism; Syrian nationalism; Syrian irredentism; Economic populism; Anti-communism
- Political position: Syncretic (Note: In the past, the party or elements of its ideology or membership have been referred to as belonging to both the political left and right, sometimes being labeled far-right.)
- National affiliation: National Progressive Front (2005–2012, 2014–2025, in Syria); Popular Front for Change and Liberation (2012–2014, in Syria); March 8 Alliance (since 2005, in Lebanon)
- International affiliation: Axis of Resistance
- Colours: Black White Red
- Anthem: !نشيد الإنتصار (lit. 'Victory Anthem!')

Party flag

Website
- https://ssnparty.org/ (Syrian chapter)

The Syrian Social Nationalist Party (SSNP; Arabic: الحزب السوري القومي الاجتماعي, romanized: al-Ḥizb al-Sūrī al-Qawmī al-ijtimāʻī) is a Syrian nationalist party operating in Syria, Lebanon, Jordan and Palestine. It advocates the establishment of a Greater Syrian nation state spanning the Fertile Crescent, including present-day Syria, Lebanon, Jordan, Iraq, Kuwait, Palestine region (includes Israel and its occupied territories), Cyprus, Sinai of Egypt, Hatay and Cilicia of Turkey, based on geographical boundaries and the common history people within the boundaries share. It has also been active in the Syrian and Lebanese diaspora, for example in South America. Until the fall of the Assad regime it was an ally of the ruling Arab Socialist Ba'ath Party, being the second-ranking party in the National Progressive Front.

Founded in Beirut in 1932 by the Lebanese intellectual Antoun Saadeh as an anticolonial political organization hostile to French colonial rule, the party played a significant role in Lebanese politics. It launched coups d'état attempts in 1949 and 1961, following which it was repressed in the country. SSNP was active in the fight against the Israeli military during the 1982 Lebanon War and subsequent Israeli occupation of Southern Lebanon until 2000, while simultaneously supporting the Syrian occupation of Lebanon due to its beliefs in Syrian irredentism.

In Syria, SSNP operated as an ultranationalist movement until the 1950s; advocating armed uprising to establish a one-party state. It participated in the 1949 Syrian coup d'état, which overthrew the democratically elected government of Shukri al-Quwatli. SSNP continued to engage in violent activities throughout the country; and was banned in 1955 after its assassination of a Syrian Ba'athist military officer Adnan al-Malki. Despite its ban, the party remained organized, and by the late 1990s had allied itself with the Palestine Liberation Organisation and the Lebanese Communist Party, despite the ideological differences between them. The SSNP was legalized in Syria in 2005, and joined the Syrian Ba'ath Party-led National Progressive Front. From 2012 to 6 May 2014, the party was part of the Popular Front for Change and Liberation. The party took the side of the Ba'athist government during the Syrian Civil War, where almost 12,000 fighters of its armed branch, the Eagles of the Whirlwind, fought alongside the Syrian Arab Armed Forces against the Syrian opposition and the Islamic State. Following the fall of the Assad regime, it was banned by the Syrian caretaker government, though it still operates openly in Lebanon as well as clandestinely in Syria.

== Background ==
=== Early Syrian nationalists ===
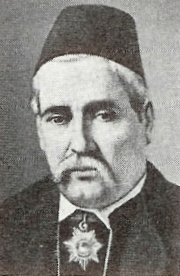
Referring to Syria, Butrus al-Bustani adopted "Love of the Homeland is an article of Faith" as a slogan when he founded the periodical Al-Jinan in 1870

In the mid-nineteenth century, Butrus al-Bustani was one of the first to assert the existence of a natural Syrian nation that should be accommodated in a reformed Ottoman Empire. He belonged to the Nahda, thinkers influenced by the Arabic Literary Renaissance and the French Revolution and who wished to shape the Tanzimat reforms, which were an attempt to introduce a constitutional monarchy with religious freedom to reverse the Ottoman state's creeping economic marginalisation and which would lead to the Young Turks and the Second Constitutional Era.

An influential follower of al-Bustani was the Belgian Jesuit historian, Henri Lammens, ordained as a priest in Beirut in 1893, who claimed that Greater Syria had since ancient times encompassed all the land between the Arab peninsula, Egypt, the Levantine corridor and the Taurus Mountains, including all the peoples within the Fertile Crescent.

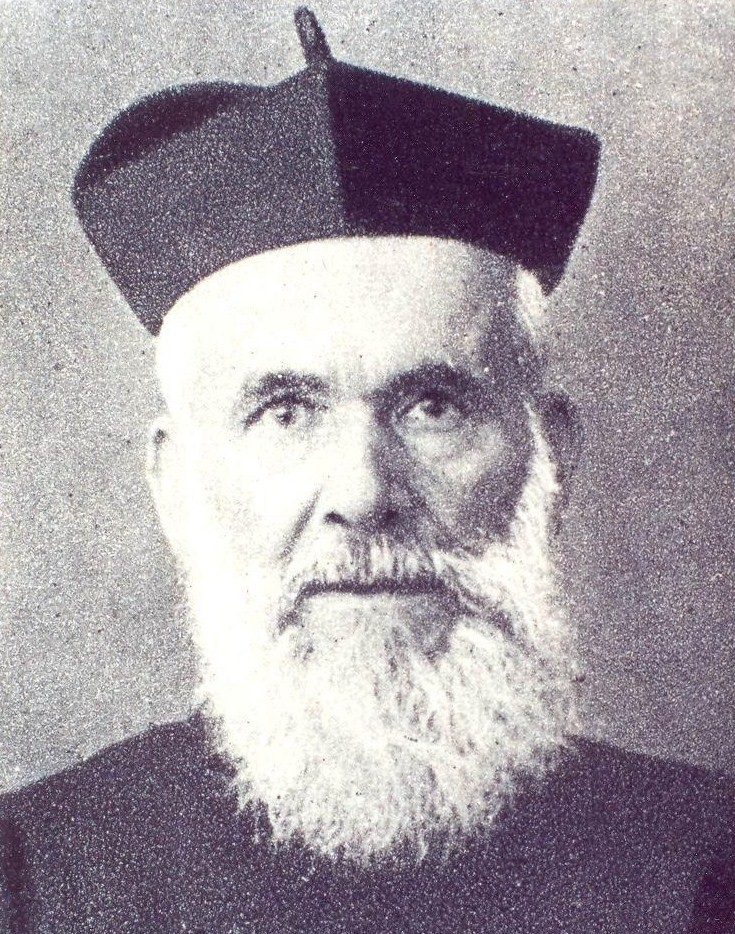
"Syria is the Tunic of Christ" – Henri Lammens.

This was also accompanied with the rise of a profoundly idealistic patriotism, largely resembling European romantic nationalism, idealizing the coming of a National Revival to the Levant, that would shake off the Ottoman past and propel back what many started to see again as the cradle of civilization into the modern world's front stage. In that aspect, the works of Kahlil Gibran who began expressing his belief in Syrian nationalism and patriotism are central. As Gibran said,

"I believe in you, and I believe in your destiny. I believe that you are contributors to this new civilization. ... I believe that it is in you to be good citizens. And what is it to be a good citizen? ... It is to stand before the towers of New York and Washington, Chicago and San Francisco saying in your hearts, "I am the descendent of a people the built Damascus and Byblos, and Tyre and Sidon and Antioch, and I am here to build with you, and with a will."

== History ==
=== Foundation and early years ===
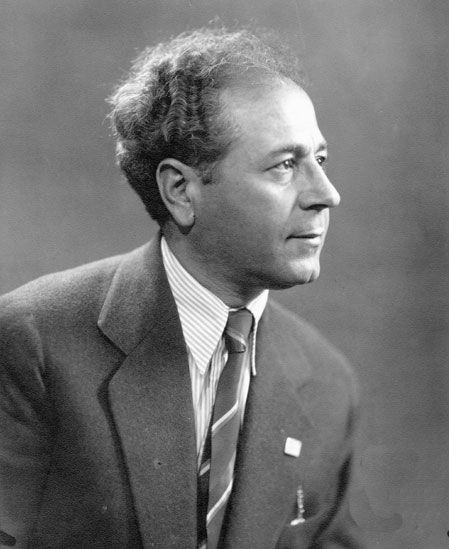
Antoun Saadeh

The SSNP was founded by Antun Saadeh, a Lebanese journalist and lecturer from a Greek Orthodox family who had lived in South America from 1919 to 1930 who secretly established the first nucleus of the Syrian Social Nationalist Party in November 1932, which operated underground for the first three years of its existence; in 1933, he started publishing the monthly journal Al-Majalla, which was distributed in the American University of Beirut and developed the party's ideology. In 1936, the party's open hostility to colonialism led to the French authorities banning the party and the imprisoning Saadeh for six months for creating a clandestine party, although an accusation of having been in contact with the German and Italian fascist movements was dropped after the Germans denied any relationship. During his time in prison Saadeh wrote The Genesis of Nations to lay out the SSNP's ideology. At that time, the Party joined ranks with other nationalist and patriotic forces including the National Bloc, whereas it began militating, in secret, for the overthrow of the Mandate. Nonetheless, the alliance between the SSNP and the National Bloc did not last long: The National Bloc refrained from engaging in actual militant activities against the French, deciding instead to cooperate with the High Commissioner. Many SSNP members also felt that the NB refused to cooperate with them because their founder was Christian.

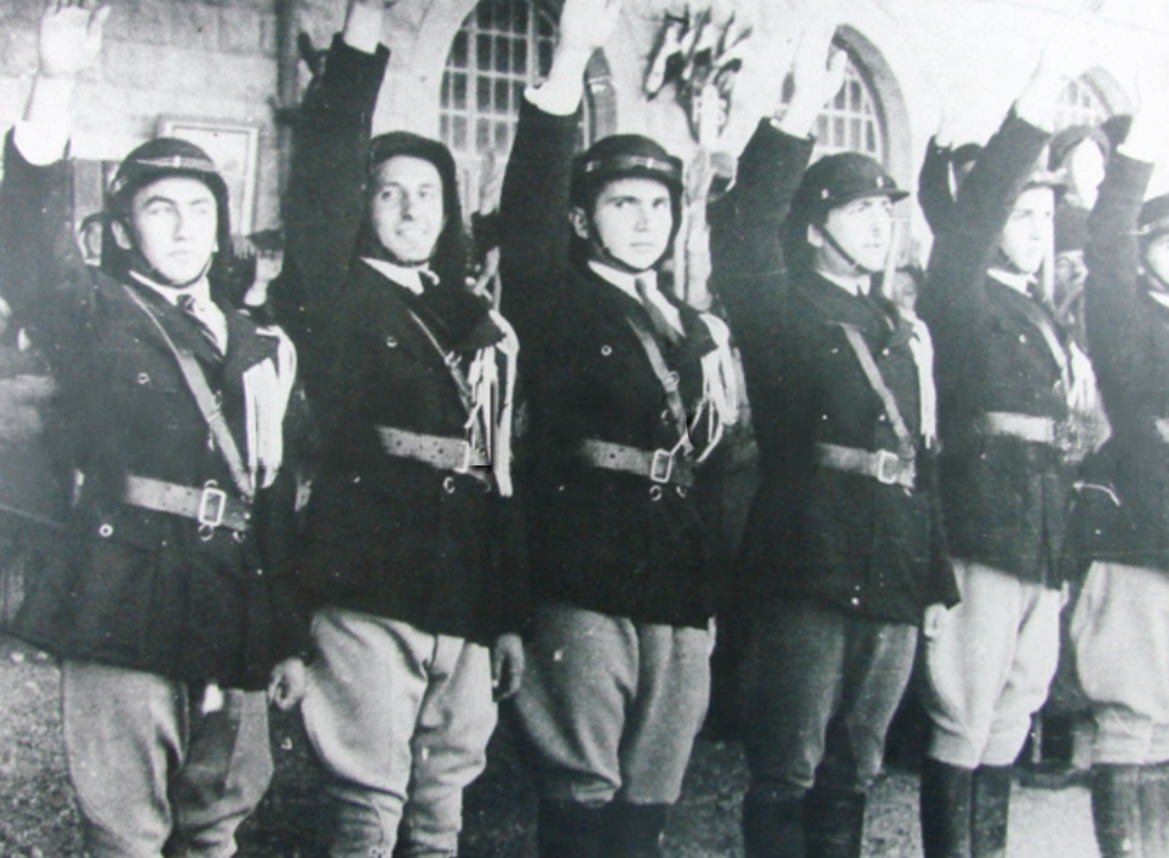
The Steel Shirts copying the Nazi salute during its rally in Syria, 1936

Saadeh emigrated again to Brazil in 1938 and afterwards to Argentina, only to return to Lebanon in 1947 following the country's independence from the French in 1943. On his way to Argentina, he visited Italy and Berlin, which increased the suspicions of the French that the SSNP might have been entertaining relations with the Axis. Coming back shortly to Lebanon in 1939, he was questioned by the French authorities who accused him of plotting with the Germans. The charge was dropped when no evidence of collaboration had been found and after that Saadeh declared that even the French rule to which he was vehemently opposed would be better than German or Italian rule. Having afterwards left for Argentina, Saadeh found out that the Argentinian branch of the SSNP newspaper had been voicing its outright support for Nazi Germany and to the Axis powers, which led Saadeh to issue a lengthy letter to the editor-in-chef, restating that the SSNP is not a National Socialist party and that no stance should be taken vis-à-vis the Allies or the Axis.

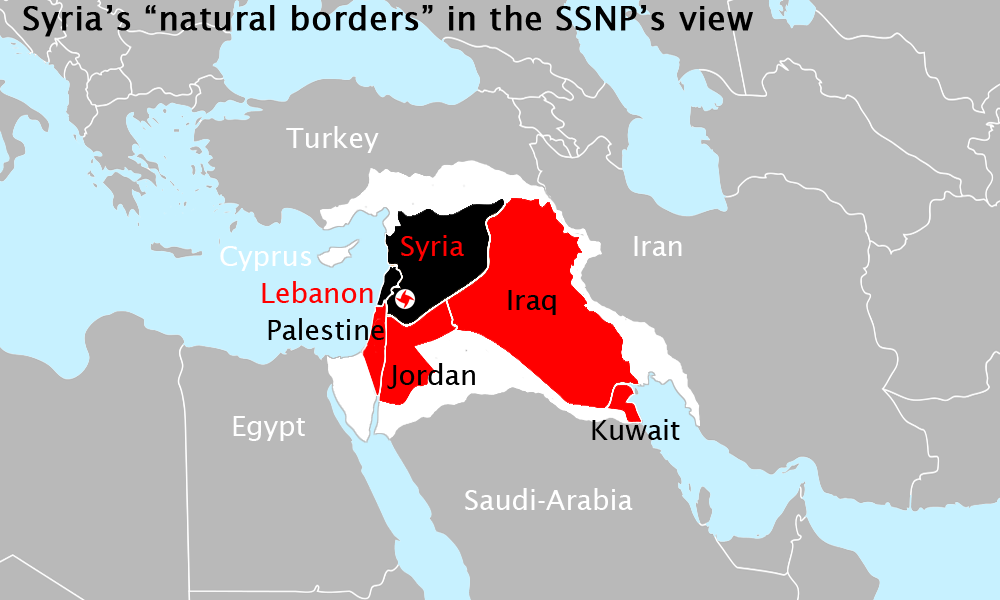
Antoun Saadeh's map of a "Natural Syria", based on the etymological connection between the name "Syria" and "Assyria".

While the Kataeb was committed to the notion of Lebanon as a nation state defined as an entity presiding over the borders outlined first by the Sykes–Picot Agreement in 1916, and afterwards by the French administrative division of its mandate into six states including the state of Greater Lebanon, and had espoused a strong bond between the nation and the church as well as outright social ultraconservatism, the SSNP rejected these national claim on the basis that the borders outlining the newly created states were fictitious, resulting from colonialism, and do not reflect any historical and social realities. The party claimed that Greater Syria as defined by Saadeh represents the national ideal encompassing the historical people of Mesopotamia and the Fertile Crescent, bound together by a clearly defined geography and a common historical, social and cultural development path away from all sectarianism.

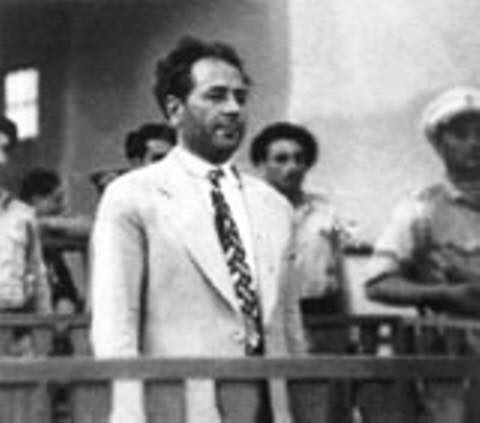
Antoun Saadeh faces his hasty and theatrical Show trial for "high treason and armed rebellion". He was summarily executed shortly afterwards.

When the Arabs lost the war in 1948, Saadeh propelled the Party into a fully confrontational stance: He deemed Arabism as a purely rhetorical gimmick, condemned the incompetence and hypocrisy of the Arab leaders, and asserted that the creation of the State of Israel and the expulsion of the Palestinians was the direct result of this incompetence.

On 4 July 1949, a year after the declaration of the establishment of the state of Israel and the 1948 Palestinian expulsion and flight (the Nakba), and a response to a series of aggressions perpetrated by the Kataeb-backed Lebanese government, the SSNP attempted its first revolution.

Following a violent crackdown by government forces, Saadeh travelled to Damascus to meet with Husni al-Za'im in an attempt to obtain his support for the revolution. A decision was taken by King Farouk, Riad el Solh and Husni al-Za'im to eliminate Antoun Saadeh, under the patronage of British Intelligence and the Mossad. As a result, Al-Za'im handed Saadeh over to Lebanese authorities, who had him executed on 8 July 1949. It was the shortest and most secretive trial given to a political offender.

Saadeh's wife Juliette Elmir and their daughters were also handed over and were imprisoned at the Greek Orthodox Our Lady of Saidnaya Monastery. Shortly after her husband's death, Elmir was appointed al-Amina al-ula (First Keeper or First Trustee) of the SSNP and her home became the SSNP's headquarters under the leadership of George Abd Messih. The SSNP allowed women to participate in activism and politics, setting a trend for the social norms for women in politics in the Levant.

=== SSNP in Lebanon ===
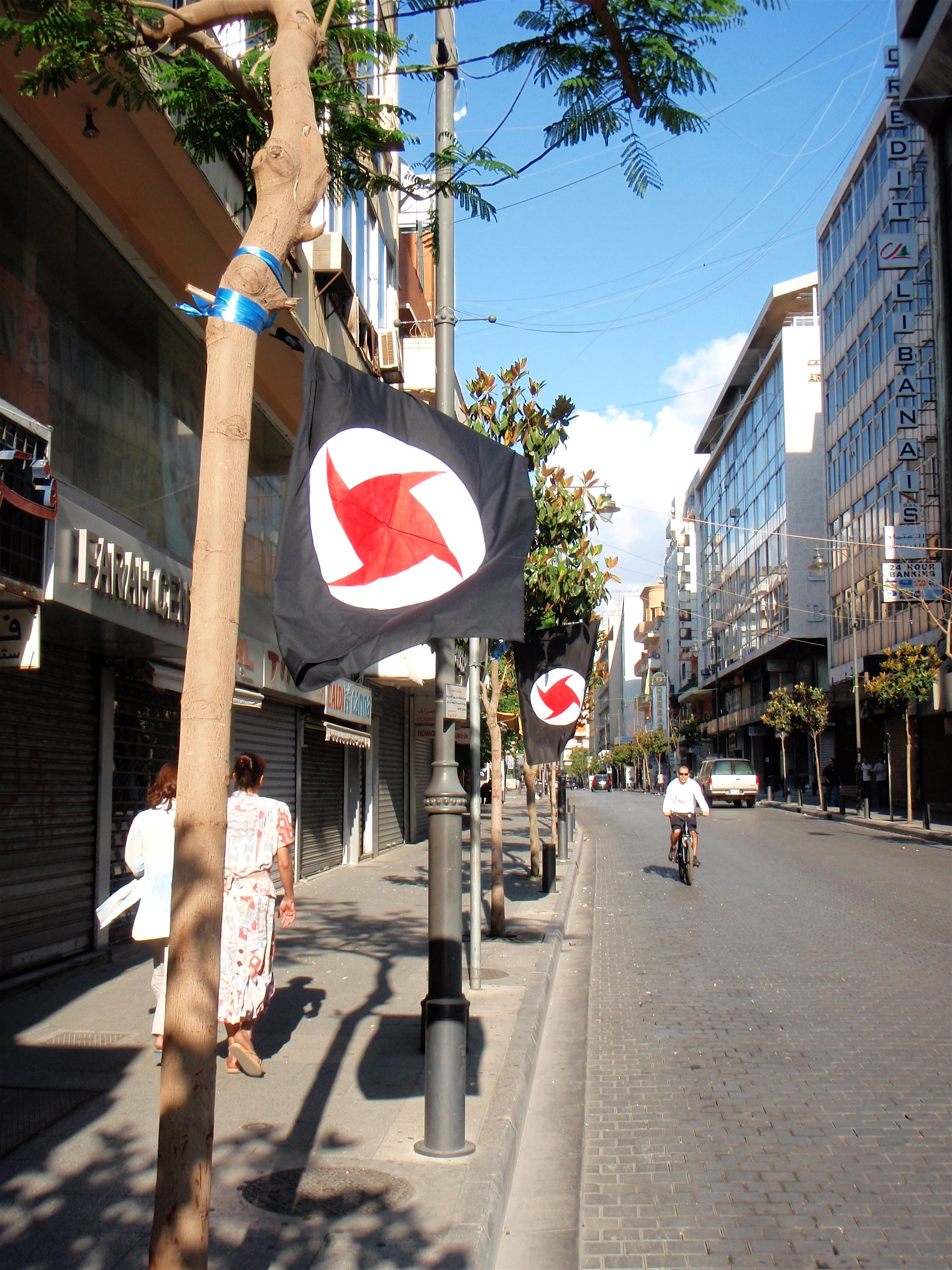
Flags of the Syrian Social Nationalist Party in Beirut on 9 May during the 2008 conflict in Lebanon

=== From confrontation to accommodation ===
After Saadeh was executed and its high-ranking leaders were arrested, the party remained underground until 1958 when it sided with the pro-Western president Camille Chamoun against the Arab nationalist rebels.

==== 1961 coup d'état ====
On the last day of 1961, two SSNP members, company commanders in the Lebanese army, led an unsuccessful attempted lightning coup against Fouad Chehab, supported by some 200 civilian SSNP members. In the scholarly literature, the coup has been explained as stemming from the party's ideological preference for violence ("bullets over ballots"), its frustration at exclusion from the Lebanese state, and both political and military criticism of the rule of Fouad Chehab.

Advisors of Chehab who allegedly witnessed armed SSNP partisans gathering around the central areas of Beirut rushed to the presidential palace to inform Chehab of the insurrection. This resulted in a renewed proscription and the imprisonment and/or execution of many SSNP leaders. Most of the party's known activists remained in prison or exile until a general amnesty in 1969. In 1969, the party re-aligned towards Arab nationalism.

==== Lebanese Civil War ====
Syrian Social Nationalist Party
- Leaders: Inaam Raad; Abdallah Saadeh; Isaam Al Mahayri
- Headquarters: Hamra Street (Beirut)
- Active regions: Lebanon
- Size: 10,000 fighters
- Part of: Lebanese National Movement; Lebanese National Resistance Front; Front of Patriotic and National Parties
- Wars: Lebanese Civil War; South Lebanon conflict (1985–2000)

With the outbreak of the Lebanese Civil War in 1975, the SSNP formed a military squad that allied with the Lebanese National Movement (LNM), against the Phalangists and their allies of the Lebanese Front. The SSNP saw the Lebanese Civil War as the inevitable result of the divisions of the Syrian nation into small states and away from a liberation war against Israel. In the mid-1970s, there were tensions within the party between "a reformist branch close to the Palestinian factions and another more inclined toward Damascus"; it reunified in 1978.

After the defeat of anti-Israeli forces in the 1982 Lebanon War, the SSNP joined a number of the organizations who regrouped to resist the Israeli occupation, including the killing of two Israeli soldiers in a Wimpy Cafe in west Beirut by party member Khalid Alwan. The U.S. Federal Bureau of Investigation blames the SSNP for the assassination, in 1982, of Bachir Gemayel, Lebanon's newly elected president supported by the Israelis besieging Beirut. An SSNP member, Habib Shartouni, was arrested for the assassination and eventually convicted for it in 2017.

In 1983, the party joined the Lebanese National Salvation Front. In 1985, a member of the party, Sana'a Mehaidli, detonated a car bomb next to an Israeli military convoy at Jezzin, South Lebanon. She killed two Israeli soldiers and become one of the first known female suicide bombers.

==== After the Civil War ====
The SSNP in Lebanon was broadly supportive of the Syrian occupation of Lebanon and was allied to pro-Syrian parties (including the March 8 Alliance) in the aftermath of the occupation.

The SSNP participated in a number of general elections in Lebanon, winning six seats in 1992, although seeing a decline in subsequent elections winning two seats in both 2005 and 2009. The SSNP were involved in the 2008 conflict in Lebanon, with gunmen attacking an SSNP office.

Assaad Hardan was party leader for two terms. Hardan was succeeded by Rabih Banat in 2020, but with a growing split in the party between Hardan's followers, who are closer to the Syrian government and the March 8 Alliance, and Banat's followers, who are closer to the administration of Saad Hariri. As of the 2022 Lebanese elections, the party did not win any seat and currently has no representation in the Lebanese Parliament.

During clashes in the context of the 2023 Gaza war and border clashes between Israel and Hezbollah, the PSNS-L took part in the conflict and lost one of its members.

=== SSNP in Syria ===
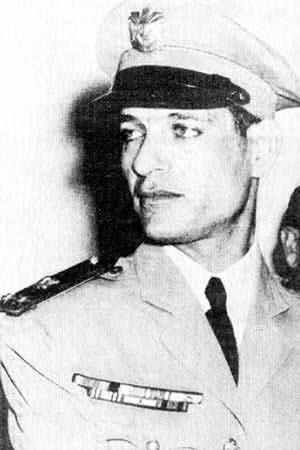
Lieutenant Colonel Adnan al-Malki, Deputy Chief of Staff of the Syrian Army, who was killed by SSNP agents on 22 April 1955. The SSNP was banned in Syria after Malki's assassination.

Saadeh had intended SSNP to be an organization that created an Italian-style Risorgimento which would bring about his project for "Greater Syria". The party promoted anti-communist conspiratorial rhetoric and believed in the formation of an all-encompassing, totalitarian state. Throughout the 1950s, the party acted as an ultranationalist entity which plotted violent insurrections and committed terrorist attacks, political assassinations, and other criminal acts. The Syrian Communist Party and Ba'ath Party were its principal rivals, both of which denounced SSNP as a Western-backed Zionist project aimed at undermining Arab unity and aiding Western interests in the region. After the SSNP's assassination of a high-ranking Syrian military officer and Arab nationalist, Adnan al-Malki, in 1955, Syrian authorities banned the party and organized a witch hunt against its members under pressure from the Ba'ath and Communist parties. Throughout the 1950s, SSNP members were captured and put on trial, imprisoned, or killed, ending the party's status as a political force in the country. The SSNP remained an outlawed group in Syria for decades, with the party's image being tarnished by the Malki affair as well as its alignment with Western interests and anti-Arab stances resented by the Syrian populace.

The SSNP's stance during the Lebanese civil war and in Lebanese politics—where it has become a close ally of Hezbollah—was consistent with that of Syria, which facilitated a rapprochement between the party and the Syrian government. During the latter years of Hafez al-Assad's presidency, the party was increasingly tolerated. After the succession of his son Bashar al-Assad in 2000, this process continued. In 2001, while still officially banned, the party was permitted to attend meetings of the Ba'ath-led National Progressive Front coalition of legal parties as an observer. In spring 2005, the party was legalised in Syria, in what has been described as "an attempt to allow a limited form of political activity".

Over time, the SSNP and the Syrian Ba'athist regime experienced a dramatic turnaround in their historical relationship, from enemies to allies. The process started as the party reckoned that Hafez al-Assad's regional goals, such as consolidating Syria's control over Lebanon and the PLO, were consistent with the SSNP's goal of establishing Greater Syria, while the SSNP reciprocated by acting as a Syrian proxy in Lebanon. The alliance has strengthened in the face of the Syrian Civil War.

In the 22 April 2007 election for the People's Council of Syria, the party gained three out of 250 seats in the parliament. In 2015, journalist Terry Glavin wrote, "But for a brief and friendly interregnum during the Baathist regime's phoney national elections of 2012, the SSNP has been a member of Bashar al-Assad's ruling coalition since 2005." Its Syrian leader is Ali Haidar, who has been one of the two non-Ba'ath party minister's in the Damascus government since 2012, as Minister of State for National Reconciliation Affairs.

==== Role in the Syrian Civil War ====
L'Orient-Le Jour reported in 2021 that the Syrian uprising/civil war "was an opportunity for the SSNP to take on a new dimension". According to Syrian analyst Samir Akil, SSNP cadres mostly came from the Christian, Alawite, and Shi'ite communities, posing a direct threat to the Assad regime, which was seeking to monopolise control over minorities by the Arab Socialist Ba'ath party. During the Syrian revolution protests, the SSNP participated in counter-demonstrations in support of the government. Once the Syrian Civil War broke out, the government reciprocated, providing weaponry and training. In the meantime, SSNP officials had become a target for rebel militants and were kidnapped and assassinated. Bashar al-Yazigi, head of the political SSNP bureau in Syria, stated that the "opposition is seeking to create sharp sectarian rifts and fragment Syrian society", with the party regarding both the ongoing Syrian Civil War and the Iraq War as attempts to partition those countries—and, eventually, Lebanon—along ethno-sectarian lines.

In 2016, estimates of the number of SSNP fighters in Syria ranged from 6,000 to 8,000. Lebanese fighters were included in their ranks, even though the party claims that "their proportion within the group's total fighting force has decreased steadily, as more Syrians sign up".

By February 2014, SSNP fighters were primarily deployed in the governorates of Homs and Damascus and were said to be the most formidable military force other than the Syrian army in Suwayda. SSNP fighters have participated in the battles of Sadad, of Ma'loula, and of al-Qaryatayn, among others. In 2016, party officials claimed that its membership had increased "by the thousands" since the start of the war as a result of its alleged "reputation as an effective fighting force in Syria".

The party was allowed a larger role in the Syrian People's Assembly: it fielded thirty candidates for the 2016 parliamentary election, winning seven seats.

However, starting from 2018, these gains began to be reversed, as Bashar al-Assad initiated an intense Ba'athification programme in regime-held territories, which sought the stronger amalgamation of the Ba'athist-state nexus and the tightening of the grip of the state. As part of its attempts to strengthen the one-party state, the Ba'ath party has also cemented its monopoly over military forces, student activism, trade unions, youth organizations, and other social associations. The new campaign also purged those Ba'ath cadres deemed insufficiently loyal from all levels of party organizations and promoted the re-structuring of Syrian society along the lines of Ba'athist ideology, characterized by absolute loyalty to the Assad dynasty, which is portrayed as the founding fathers of the Syrian state.

The SSNP was one of the biggest losers in the 2020 Syrian parliamentary elections, with its allotted seats being reduced from seven to three. The elections showcased the absolute dominance of the Arab Socialist Ba'ath party in the political system by increasing the Ba'athist share to two-thirds of the total, or 167 seats. This was also part of the Assad regime's wider clampdown on SSNP activities to curb its influence in Syria that was gained during the civil war. The Ba'athist government also dissolved the Eagles of the Whirlwind, the SSNP's paramilitary wing in the country.

The anti-SSNP clampdown was also part of Bashar al-Assad's feud with his cousin Rami Makhlouf, who headed the SSNP (Amana) faction and was widely reviled as a symbol of corruption in the regime. Bashar al-Assad had banned the SSNP (Amana) faction on 10 October 2019 and ordered the confiscation of his cousin's business assets. Makhlouf's private militias, which fought alongside the Syrian military, were also disbanded by the government. SSNP leaders criticized their sidelining in the 2020 parliamentary elections as a betrayal, with many party cadres viewing the authoritarian measures of the government with dismay.

In 2023, the SSNP announced their support for the October 7 attacks, congratulating Hamas for launching the offensive and asking for the Palestinian National Authority to join the fight. The SSNP further claimed that terrorism is a "tool for the Jewish project" rather than for Hamas.

In the 2024 parliamentary election, the last held in Ba'athist Syria, they retained their three seats as members of the National Progressive Front.

==== Post-Assad ====
Following the fall of the Assad dictatorship, the SSNP (Banat faction) published a statement separating itself from the old regime, accusing it of "contributing to the fragmentation of our party's institutions" and calling for unity to maintain national sovereignty, institutions and interests. It also called for confronting the ongoing Israeli invasion of Syria.

=== SSNP in Jordan ===
In 1966, King Hussein had his security services sent into action to eradicate the SSNP from Jordan. The party had been active among the Palestinian population.

In 2013 followers of the party established the "Movement of Syrian Social Nationalists in Jordan".

== Ideology ==
Scholars and analysts have debated how the SSNP's ideology should be described. For example, L'Orient-Le Jour write that Saadeh's "national vision was based on belonging to one's geographical milieu, rather than one's race. His supporters insist that their leader chose the party's emblem long before he learned of Nazism." Christopher Solomon states that SSNP's persistent backing of the Ba'athist government since its occupation of Lebanon, has positioned the party in the left-wing side of political spectrum. Other sources are less definitive. Political rivals of SSNP have commonly labelled Antoun Saadeh as a fascist ideologue who formed relations with Nazis during the Second World War. Saadeh was aware of accusations of fascism, and he responded to them during his speech of 1 June 1935:

The system of the Syrian Social Nationalist Party is not a Hitlerite or a Fascist system, but that it is purely a Syrian system which does not stand on unprofitable imitation, but on basic originality which is one of the characteristics of our people.

— Antun Saadeh, June 1935

Throughout the Second World War, Saadeh was rumoured to have close contacts with officials of Fascist Italy and Nazi Germany. Some scholars have made comparisons of SSNP's ideological and organizational resemblances with European fascism, and of its external symbols to those of German Nazism, although these criticisms are not accepted by the party itself. Bellingcat calls it a "rabidly anti-Semitic, fascist organization [with] international ties to the far-right."

According to historian Stanley G. Payne, interwar Arab nationalism was influenced by European fascism, with the creation of at least seven Arab nationalist shirt movements similar to the brown shirt movement by 1939, with the most influenced ones being the SSNP, the Iraqi Futawa youth movement and the Young Egypt movement. These three movements would share characteristics like being territorially expansionist, with the SSNP wanting the complete control of Syria, belief in the superiority of their own people (with Saadeh theorizing a "distinct and naturally superior" Syrian race), being "nonrationalist, anti-intellectual, and highly emotional" and "[emphasizing] military virtues and power [and stressing] self-sacrifice". Also according to Payne, all these movements received strong influence from European fascism and praised the Italian and German fascism but "[they never became] fully developed fascist movements, and none reproduced the full characteristics of European fascism"; the influence in Arab nationalism remained long after 1945. Also, Saadeh's superior race was not a pure one, but a fusion of all races in Syrian history. The SSNP would be "[an] elite group, with little structure for mobilization".

According to researcher Wissam Samia, Saadeh defined the policy of the SSNP in a newspaper he founded in 1947 called 'Suriah al-jadida' (New Syria) in a letter to its board of directors. He defined the party's policy as "Syrian nationalist policy that is not mixed with any foreign policy", and emphasized that the party's policy is not fascist, Nazi, or "democratic", and that the party's politics is not communist or Bolshevik.

Prior to the fall of the Assad regime, the party referred to political opponents of the regime as "internal Jews." The SSNP supports a centralised unitary state for Syria.

=== Nationalism ===
==== Greater Syria, natural Syria ====
While in jail from early February to early May 1936, Saadeh completed The Genesis of Nations which he had started writing three months before the French authorities in Lebanon discovered the secret organization and arrested its leader and his assistants. In his book, Saadeh formulated his belief in the existence of a Syrian nation in a homeland defined as embracing all historic Syria extended to the Suez Canal in the south, and that includes modern Syria, Palestine, Israel, Lebanon, Jordan, Iraq, and Kuwait. The boundaries of the historic environment in which the Syrian nation evolved went much beyond the scope usually ascribed to Syria, extending from the Taurus range in the north-east and the Zagros mountains in the north-west to the Suez Canal and the Red Sea in the south and includes the Sinai peninsula and the Gulf of Aqaba, and from the Mediterranean Sea in the west, including the island of Cyprus, to the arch of the Arabian desert and the Persian Gulf in the east. According to Saadeh, this region is also called the Syrian Fertile Crescent, the island Cyprus being its star.

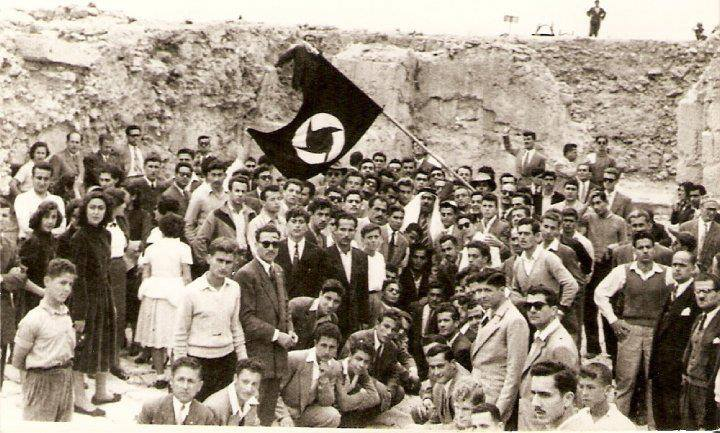
SSNP members at Saadeh's return from exile in 1947.

These natural geographical factors hence create the societal framework in which man establishes his existence, beliefs, habits, and value systems. Saadeh's critique of ethnic nationalisms led him to hence develop a framework of geographical nationalism, the idea of the "natural homeland". When he applied this model to the case of the Fertile Crescent, the conclusion he reached was straightforward: the natural geographical factors of the basin lying east of the Mediterranean is what has allowed it to become the cradle of civilizations, what has driven throughout the course of human history movements seeking to unify it, what has allowed it to establish, through ethnic, religious and cultural assimilation and mixing, a high culture and civilization, and what has made it the prize coveted by all imperialist powers. Saadeh advocated for all ethnoreligious groups to consider themselves as descendants of the pre-Christian era empires of Babylon and Assyria, of the Hittites and the kings of Aram, then of the Islamic empires, all the way up until the present.

In Saadeh's vision of "harmony" among the country's ethnic and religious communities through a return to a so-called Syrian "racial unity" which was itself in fact a mixture of races, neither Islam nor pan-Arabism was important, and therefore religion wasn't either. Saadeh's concept of the nation was shaped mainly by historical concrete interactions amongst people over the centuries in a given geography, rather than being based on ethnic origins, race, language or religion. This led him also to conclude that the Arabs could not form one nation, but many nations could be called Arab.

==== Syrian people ====
Unlike other militant nationalist parties in the Arab World, Syrian Social Nationalist Party was unique in its espousal of an exclusive form of nationalism which glorified the pre-Christian era, advocating the union of all Syrian peoples under a "Greater Syria". The party admitted Christians, Muslims and Druzites into its ranks, but denied the Jews in Syria any membership, even if they were opposed to Zionism.

==== Romantic nationalism ====
The attitude of the party and its founder towards minority separatism and movements calling for ethnically separate homelands was one of outright hostility. Saadeh was also hostile to all religiously motivated political movements, or movements that did not call for the separation between Church (or Mosque) and State. The incoming Jewish migrants to Southern Syria (Palestine) and the Jewish communities were criticized for their "foreign and racial loyalties", their unwillingness to assimilate, and their active willingness to create an ethnically Jewish state in Palestine, with Saadeh deeming the Jews as the community unable and unwilling to assimilate, and having criticized the notion that Jewishness can be a cornerstone for a nation-state. For the SSNP, the Jews do not constitute a nation as they are a heterogeneous mixture of peoples in a similar sense that Muslims and Christians do not constitute a nation. Similarly, the Kurds were criticized for their communitarianism and their disposition to establish a Kurdish state in the north.

==== Liberation war ====
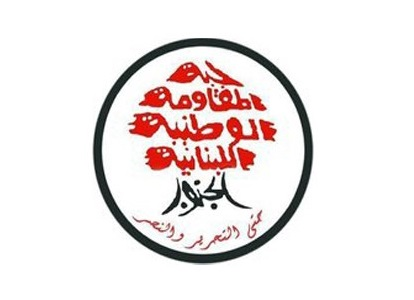
The flag of the Lebanese National Resistance Front, a coalition of armed groups that assembled to fight off the Israeli invasion of Lebanon.

In 1949, it declared the "First Renaissance Revolution" against the Lebanese government, an armed confrontation with the Lebanese and Syrian security forces that ended in a disaster and the execution of Antun Saadeh by the Lebanese authorities on 8 July. Not too long later, party members assassinated the Lebanese Prime Minister Riad al-Solh who was instrumental in Saadeh's death penalty. To avoid being caught, the assailants committed suicide. When one of the assailants survived and woke up in the hospital, he completed his suicide attempt by tearing up his wounds and falling from the bed. The assassination of the general prosecutor who judged Saadeh was also conducted by a Party cell, and Party members are believed to have been involved in the assassination of Husni al-Zaim, the Syrian dictator who captured Saadeh and handed him over to the Lebanese authorities.

In 1982, party member Habib al-Shartouni assassinated the Lebanese President Bachir Gemayel, seen as betraying the country in the Israeli invasion of Lebanon in 1982. The party also undertook many operations against Israeli presence in Lebanon, including a military operation in broad daylight against Israeli officers stationed in Beirut, which triggered the beginning of the generalized armed struggle for Lebanese liberation. Party member Sana'a Mehaidli, known as the first female suicide bomber, detonated herself in her car along with an Israeli convoy in south Lebanon.

=== Secularism ===
The SSNP's ideology was an entirely secular form of nationalism; indeed, it posited the complete separation of religion and politics as one of the two fundamental conditions for real national unity, alongside economic and social reform.

=== Party form ===
The SSNP was organised with a hierarchical structure and a powerful leader.

=== Iconography and symbolism ===
==== Emblem and flag ====
The party's emblem is the whirlwind (Arabic: زوبعة, romanized: Zawba'a). It was designed by the SSNP students at the American University of Beirut while the party was still clandestine and before the French authorities had uncovered it in 1936. Saadeh stated the whirlwind was found engraved on ancient Syrian artifacts, and it is known from for example Sumerian art. The party flag features a red hurricane, called the Zawba'a, within a white disc on a black background. Each arm symbolizes one of the four virtues of the party's mission: freedom, duty, discipline and power. According to SSNP lore, the black color symbolizes the Dark Ages of Ottoman rule, colonialism, sectarian division, national division, and backwardness. The Zawba'a represents the blood of the SSNP martyrs bound together as Muslims and Christians through freedom, duty, discipline and power as a hurricane to purge the Dark Ages and spark their nation's rejuvenation and renaissance. Critics and scholars claim that the symbol was modeled after the Nazi swastika a claim that the party vehemently denies.

== Criticism ==
=== Ideological criticism ===
Arab nationalist thinker Sati' al-Husri considered that Saadeh "misrepresented" Arab nationalism, incorrectly associating it with a Bedouin image of the Arab and with Muslim sectarianism. Palestinian historian Maher Charif sees Saadeh's theory as a response to the religious diversity of Syria, and points to his later extension of his vision of the Syrian nation to include Iraq, a country also noted for its religious diversity, as further evidence for this. The party also accepted that due to "religious and political considerations", the separate existence of Lebanon was necessary for the time being. From 1945 onward, the party adopted a more nuanced stance regarding Arab nationalism, seeing Syrian unity as a potential first step towards an Arab union led by Syria.

Journalist Christopher Hitchens and his team were assaulted in February 2009 by SSNP paramilitaries in the streets of Beirut before being rescued by a crowd. The attack left Hitchens with body injuries and a limp in his leg. Reporting to Vanity Fair in May 2009, Hitchens described SSNP as a "suicide-bomber front" that carries out terrorist operations in Lebanon on behalf of Ba'athist Syria. He asserted that SSNP was a violent fascist movement; noting its irredentist ambitions of creating "Greater Syria", a project that sought the annexation or partial conquest of numerous nation-states in the region. Recounting the events of the assault, Hitchens stated:

"What shook me is how nearly it could have got fantastically nasty. We could have been hurt or taken away. These militias have their own private dungeons. I wouldn't fancy spending time in one of those."

=== Scholarly criticism ===
Lebanese historian Kamal Salibi gives a somewhat contrasting interpretation, pointing to the position of the Greek Orthodox community as a large minority in both Syria and Lebanon for whom "the concept of pan-Syrianism was more meaningful than the concept of Arabism" while at the same time they resented Maronite dominance in Lebanon. According to Salibi,

Saadeh found a ready following among his co-religionists. His idea of secular pan-Syrianism also proved attractive to many Druzes and Shiites; to Christians other than the Greek Orthodox, including some Maronites who were disaffected by both Lebanism and Arabism; and also to many Sunnite Muslims who set a high value on secularism, and who felt that they had far more in common with their fellow Syrians of whatever religion or denomination than with fellow Sunnite or Muslim Arabs elsewhere. Here again, an idea of nationalism had emerged which had sufficient credit to make it valid. In the Lebanese context, however, it became ready cover for something more archaic, which was essentially Greek Orthodox particularism.

Prof. Salibi remarks on the beginnings of Saadeh's party in the 1930s: "[A]mong its first members were students and young graduates of the American University of Beirut." This early party was "mainly Greek Orthodox and Protestants with some Shi'ites and Druzes ... ." In Lebanon as a whole the party was not popular. "Christians were generally opposed to their Syrian unionism, while Muslims were suspicious of their reservations with regard to pan-Arabism. The Lebanese authorities were able to suppress them without difficulty."

== See also ==
- Antoun Saadeh
- 1958 Lebanon crisis
- Lebanese Civil War
- Lebanese National Movement
- Mountain War (Lebanon)
- Lebanese Communist Party
- Anti-Zionism
- Secularism in Lebanon
- Syrian Social Nationalist Party – Intifada Wing

== Sources ==
- Charif, Maher, Rihanat al-nahda fi'l-fikr al-'arabi, Damascus, Dar al-Mada, 2000
- Hourani, Albert, La Pensée Arabe et l'Occident (French translation of Arab Thought in the Liberal Age)
- Irwin, Robert (3 January 2005). "An Arab Surrealist". The Nation. pp. 23–24, 37–38. Archived from the original on 4 April 2024.
- Salibi, K. S., The Modern History of Lebanon (New York: Praeger 1965)
- Salibi, Kamal, A House of Many Mansions: The History of Lebanon Reconsidered, University of California, Berkeley, 1988; reprint: London, I.B. Tauris, 1998 ISBN 1-86064-912-2
- Seale, Patrick, Asad: the Struggle for the Middle East, Berkeley, University of California Press, 1988 ISBN 0-520-06976-5
- Solomon, Christopher (2021). In Search of Greater Syria: The History and Politics of the Syrian Social Nationalist Party (1st ed.). London, UK: I.B. Tauris. ISBN 978-1838606404.
- Yonker, Carl C. (2021). The Rise and Fall of Greater Syria: A Political History of the Syrian Social Nationalist Party. Berlin: De Gruyter. ISBN 978-3110728477.
