= Syrian Social Nationalist Party – Intifada Wing =

Political party

Syrian Social Nationalist Party – Intifada Wing الحزب السوري القومي الاجتماعي – جناح الانتفاضة
- Abbreviation: SSNP–IW
- Leader: Ali Haidar
- Founder: Antoun Saadeh
- Founded: 1957
- Banned: 29 January 2025 (in Syria)
- Split from: SSNP
- Ideology: Social nationalism Syrian nationalism Syrian irredentism Pro-Assad
- Political position: Syncretic
- National affiliation: Popular Front for Change and Liberation (2012-2014)
- Colors: Black, red, and white

Party flag

The Syrian Social Nationalist Party – Intifada Wing (Arabic: الحزب السوري القومي الإجتماعي - جناح الإنتفاضة) or Abd al-Masih Wing (Arabic: جناح عبد المسيح) was a splinter group of the Syrian Social Nationalist Party.

The split had its roots in how George Abd al-Masih had utilized his post as SSNP chairman to order the assassination of Adnan al-Malki in April 1954, in order to settle a personal score and without consulting the party leadership. The killing of al-Malik brought upon SSNP a massive crack-down in Syria. After his expulsion from SSNP in 1957, Abd al-Masih continued to operate his own faction. The Abd al-Masih wing remained a relatively small force. Abd al-Masih still led the group as of the 1980s.

The party traditionally did not contest elections in Lebanon. During the Syrian Civil War followers of the party participated in support of the Syrian government and the Syrian Military. As of 2018 the party is led by Dr. Ali Haidar, the former Minister of Reconciliation in Syria. Ali Haidar's SSNP supported the re-election of Bashar al-Assad.
