= Eagles of the Whirlwind =

Armed wing of the Syrian Social Nationalist Party

- نسور الزوبعة
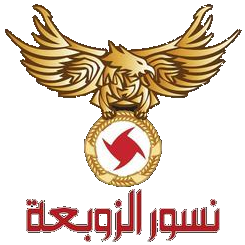
- Eagles of the Whirlwind logo
- Dates active: 1975–present (in Lebanon); 2012–present (in Syria)
- Active regions: Syria, Lebanon
- Ideology: Social nationalism Syrian nationalism Syrian irredentism Anti-Zionism
- Political position: Syncretic
- Size: 6,000–8,000 (2015, in Syria)
- Part of: Syrian Social Nationalist Party; Syrian Social Nationalist Party in Lebanon; Lebanese National Movement (LNM); Lebanese National Resistance Front (LNRF); Front of Patriotic and National Parties (FPNP)
- Wars: Lebanese Civil War; South Lebanon conflict (1985–2000); 2006 Lebanon War; 2008 Lebanon conflict; Syrian civil war; Middle Eastern crisis (2023–present); 2026 Lebanon war

The Eagles of the Whirlwind (Arabic: نسور الزوبعة, Nusour al Zawba'a) is the armed wing of the Syrian Social Nationalist Party. Around 6,000 to 8,000 men strong, they participated in many battles and operations throughout the Syrian Civil War fighting alongside the Syrian government and its allies.

After the civil war in Syria turned into a full-scale war, the Eagles began taking recruits and their fighters were primarily deployed in the governorates of Homs and Damascus and were said to be the most formidable military force other than the Syrian Army in Suwayda. Their most notable military operations is their participation in the battles of Sadad, Maaloula, and al-Qaryatayn, among others.

As part of campaigns launched by the Ba'ath party to strengthen its role in Syrian society since 2019, Syrian wing of SSNP (Amana) financed by businessman Rami Makhlouf was banned. This was part of the wider clampdown on business assets and private militias of Rami Makhlouf ordered by Bashar al-Assad. In November 2019, Ba'athist authorities initiated crackdown on armed SSNP militias across the country, and dismantled Eagles of Whirlwind. EOW fighters were subsequently assimilated into Russian-backed Fifth Corps after surrendering their artillery.

In Lebanon, the Eagles, composed of Christians and Muslims, have been active since the Lebanese Civil War by integrating the Lebanese National Resistance Front with the support of the Syrian Armed Forces, who fought the Lebanese Forces and allied Maronite militias of Israel. They recently participated in the 2023–2024 border clashes against the Israeli army alongside Hezbollah, with which they have a history of armed cooperation since the 1990s against the Israeli army.

== Ideology ==
The eagles were the armed wing of the SSNP and thus shared the same ideologies and goals. The SSNP's core ideology is Syrian nationalism and the belief in the concept of a 'Greater Syria' or 'Natural Syria' which extends from the Taurus range north of Syria to the Suez Canal in Egypt, thus encompassing the modern states of Syria, Lebanon, Iraq, Kuwait, Jordan, Palestine, Israel and parts of Egypt, Turkey and Iran. Despite political differences with the ruling Ba'ath party, SSNP stood by the Assad government throughout the course of the Syrian Civil War until Assad fled the country.

The Eagles are anti-Zionist because, following the ideology of Pan-Syrianism, they consider Palestine to be part of natural Greater Syria.

Allied with the Syrian Ba'ath Party despite ideological differences, the SSNP and its armed wing supported the Syrian Ba'athist government during the Lebanese Civil War, the Syrian occupation of Lebanon and then the Syrian civil war.

== History ==
=== Creation in Lebanon ===
The Eagles were formed in Lebanon in 1975, at the start of the Lebanese Civil War. They specialize in guerrilla actions and harassment of enemy troops. They formed an allied squad and then member of the Lebanese National Movement and then its successor, the Lebanese National Resistance Front, which brings together opponents of the Lebanese Front. At the same time, the divided SSNP reunified under a common leadership based in Beirut in 1978. The SSNP-L found its natural allies in the Palestinian guerrillas, mainly Fatah and the PFLP, as well as in its former bitter enemies: left-wing Arab nationalist movements, the Syrian Ba'ath Party and the communists.

The Eagles developed during the 1980s where they attacked and harassed both the Lebanese Forces and the Israeli Army, with some members using suicide bombings to destroy groups of enemy factions.

After the Israeli invasion of Lebanon in 1982 and the subsequent renewal of left-wing forces, a number of left-wing organizations banded together to participate in resistance to the Israeli occupation. Alongside the Lebanese Communist Party, the Organization of Communist Action in Lebanon, and some small left-wing groups, the Syrian Social Nationalist Party played a leading role in this regard. One of the most prominent sparks of resistance was the assassination of two Israeli soldiers at the Wimpy Café in the middle of Hamra Street, west Beirut, by party member Khaled Alwan. The party continues to celebrate this date. The FBI blamed them for the 1982 assassination of Bachir Gemayel, then Lebanese president-elect, who was supported by the Israeli invaders besieging Beirut.

In 1983, the SSNP joined the Lebanese National Salvation Front alongside the Marada Brigade, a Christian militia allied with Damascus. The same year, the party joined the Lebanese National Resistance Front, created to oppose the failure of the 17 May agreement with Israel, signed by Bachir Gemayel's brother, Amine Gemayel. Some party members were willing to sacrifice their lives by participating in martyrdom operations on Israel, the first in 1985. One of the party's members, Sanaa Mehaidli, a sixteen-year-old member of the Eagles who committed a martyrdom operation on an Israeli checkpoint in Lebanon, was considered "a predecessor of all the martyrs of the Palestinian cause."

Within the Lebanese National Resistance Front, the Eagles participated alongside Hezbollah in the war on the Israeli Army and its collaborators in the South Lebanon Army, thus explaining why the Eagles did not surrender their weaponry after the end of the Lebanese civil war, as they participated in the war to eliminate Israeli invaders between 1991 and 2000.

In 2006, the Eagles participated, in collaboration with Hezbollah, in the 2006 Lebanon–Israel War.

=== In Syria ===
In 2011, against the backdrop of the Arab Spring, a rebellion broke out in Syria, leading to the Syrian civil war. The Syrian branch of the Eagles was formed in 2012 and supports loyalist forces but is autonomous from the Syrian armed forces. The Syrian Eagles also fought alongside Hezbollah and the Syrian Armed Forces against various rebel and jihadist groups, notably during the battle of Maaloula where the town, inhabited by Christians (like most of the Eagles including a large number of them are Christians), had fallen into the hands of fundamentalist troops of the al-Nusra Front. Subsequently, the Eagles, in cooperation with Hezbollah, participated in the Battle of Zabadani supported by the Iranian Revolutionary Guards. They also took part in the Battle of Aleppo, allied to the pro-Assad Palestinian units of the Liwa al-Quds, Hezbollah, various Shia militias of Iraq and the Ba'ath Brigades which ended by a decisive victory for the Syrian Arab Republic against Daesh and the rebels of the Free Syrian Army.

The group fought against the Islamic State alongside the Druze militias Men of Dignity and Al-Jabal Brigade in July 2018.

In 2019, the Syrian Ba'athist government decided to integrate the Eagles into the Syrian Arab Army.

On 3 August 2025, Nashwan al-Shaer, a Druze fighter from the city of Suwayda, was killed during clashes between Druze militias and Syrian government forces in the western countryside of Suwayda Governorate. According to open-source information, he was a member of the Eagles of the Whirlwind.

=== 2023–2026 Lebanese–Israeli clashes ===
The Lebanese branch of the Eagles are participating in the ongoing war on the Lebanese border alongside Hezbollah on the invading Israeli forces, following the Gaza–Israel war.

== See also ==
- Belligerents in the Syrian civil war
- Christians in Syria
- Lebanese Civil War
- List of extrajudicial killings and political violence in Lebanon
- Lebanese Front
- Lebanese National Movement
- List of weapons of the Lebanese Civil War
