= Saidnaya =

Saidnaya صيدنايا Sednaya, Seidnaya, Saydnaya
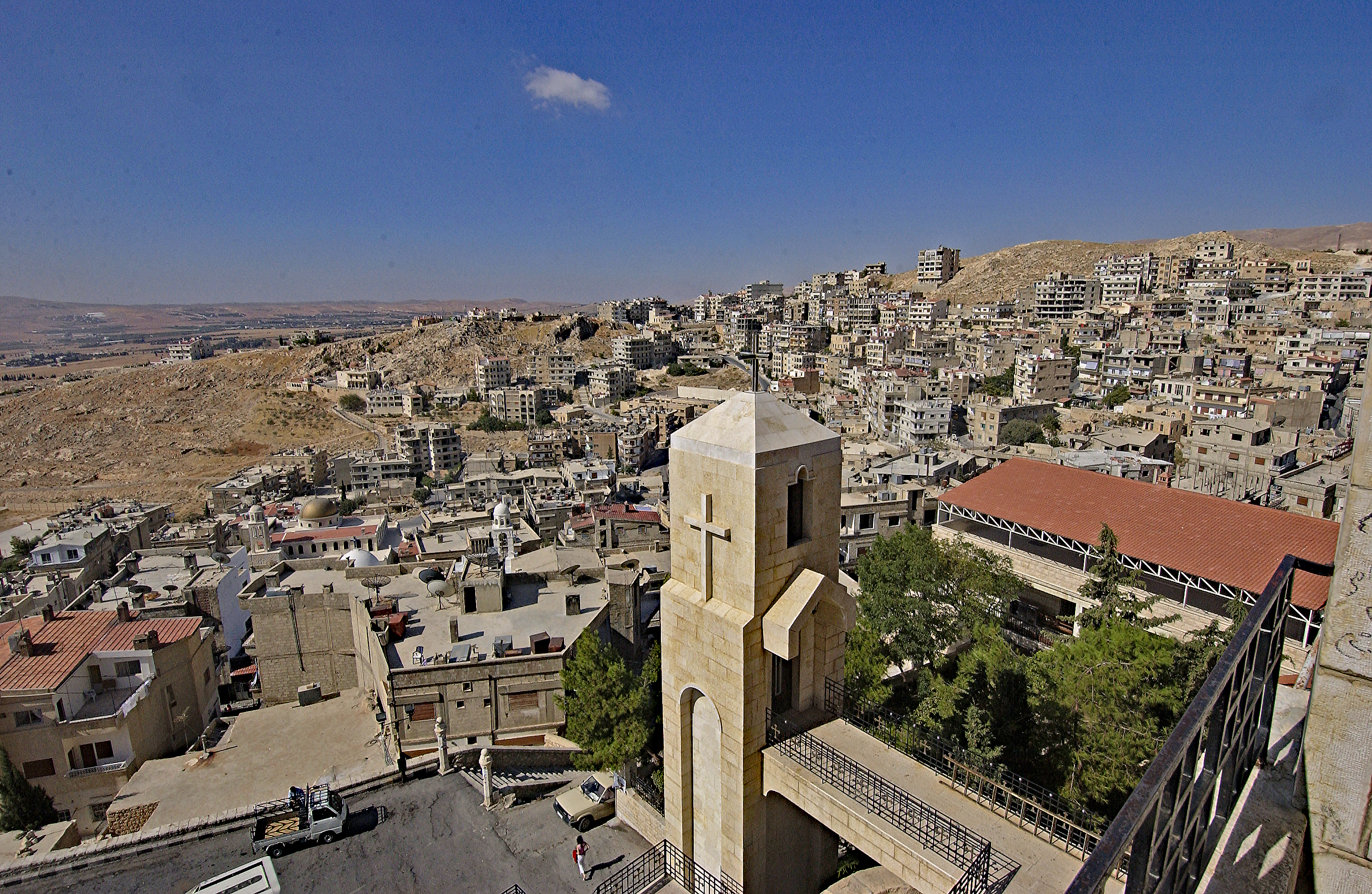
- General view of Saydnaya from Our Lady of Saidnaya Monastery

- Location in Syria
- Coordinates: 33°41′48″N 36°22′26″E
- Country: Syria
- Governorate: Rif Dimashq
- District: al-Tall
- Subdistrict: Saidnaya
- Elevation: 1,500 m (4,900 ft)

Population (2004 census)
  - Total: 5,194
- Time zone: +2
  - Summer (DST): +3

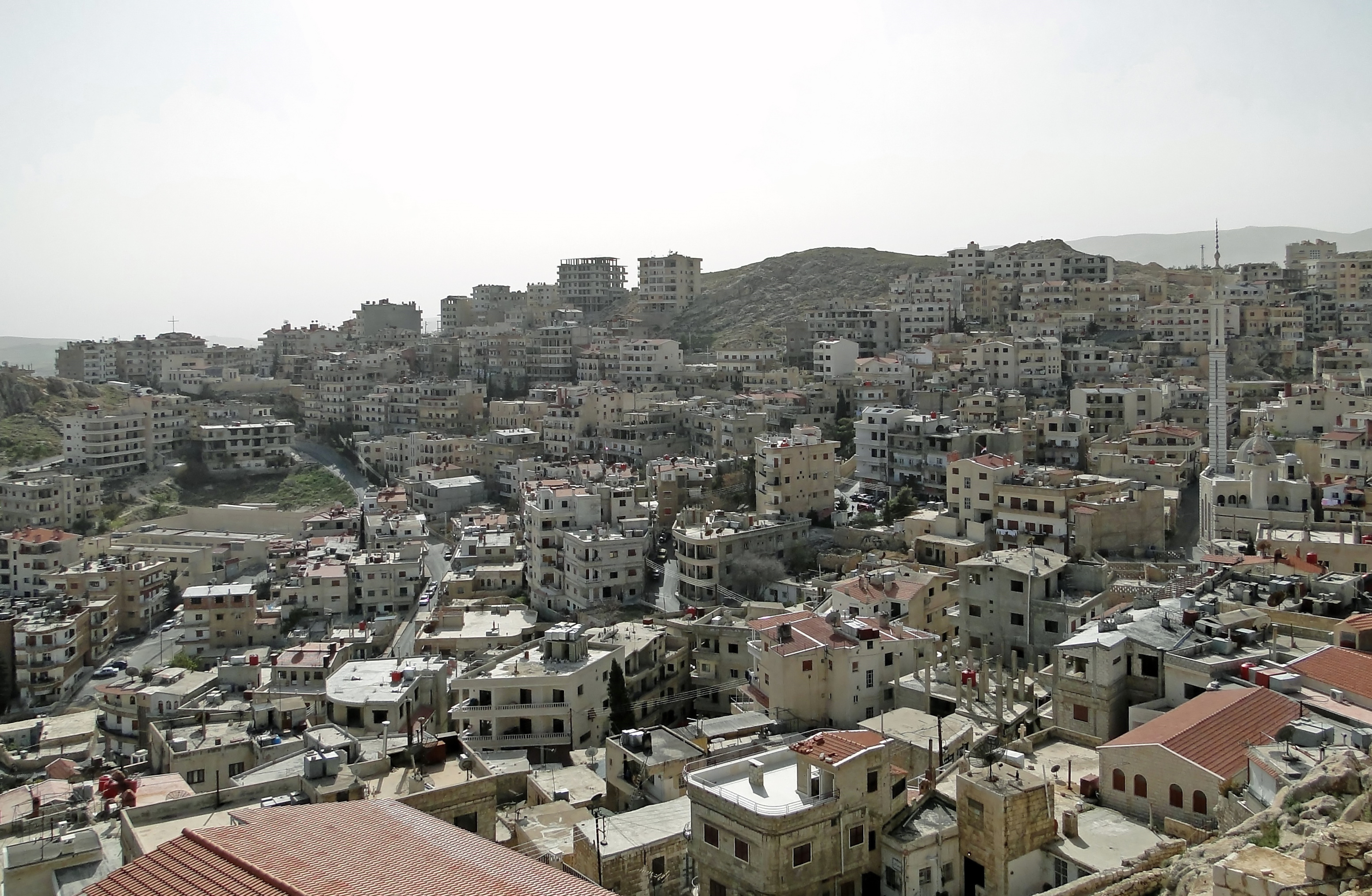
View of the city in 2010

Saidnaya (Arabic: صيدنايا, romanized: Ṣaydnāyā), also transliterated as Saydnaya, Seidnaya or Sednaya, is a city located in the mountains, 1,500 m (4,900 ft) above sea level, 27 km (17 mi) north of the city of Damascus in Syria. It is the home of a Greek Orthodox monastery traditionally held to have been founded by Byzantine emperor Justinian I, and where a renowned icon of the Virgin Mary is revered by Christians to this day. According to the Syria Central Bureau of Statistics (CBS), Saidnaya had a population of 5,194 in the 2004 census.

== Etymology ==
Local tradition holds that Saydnaya means ‘Halting-place of the gazelle’. The place-name has also been thought to mean Our Lady the New, from the Greek nea, ‘new’, and the Arabic sayyida, ‘lady’. However, the word sayd is generally related to hunting, and naya is a typical place-suffix in Syriac; therefore, Saydnaya probably means simply a hunting-place. Indeed, in ancient times, a temple of Saydoun, the Phoenician god of the hunt, stood in this once densely forested region. Under later Christian and Arabic influence, perhaps the name may have been thought to mean the ‘place of the Lady’.

The Hellenistic-era name for the region centered in the Barada Valley was Abilene: the local tradition has thus long held it as the site where the grave of Abel, slain brother of Cain, lies. Scholars consider it likely that the capital of Abilene was the city of Saidnaya.

== Overview ==
Long a center of Christian pilgrimage, pilgrims from all over the world seek Saidnaya for renewal of faith and for healing. Renowned for its faithfulness to Christianity, tradition holds that the Convent of Our Lady of Saidnaya was constructed by Justinian I, the Byzantine emperor in 547 AD, after he had two visions of Mary, one that indicated where to build the church and the other outlining its design. Justinian dedicated the finished project to the feast of Mary's Nativity, and annually thereafter on September 8, and through to the present day, both Muslim and Christian pilgrims have come to commemorate the feast day of Our Lady of Saidnaya. Also located in the convent of Saidnaya is an icon of the Holy Mother and Child known as the Shaghurah and reputed to have been painted by Luke the Evangelist which is believed to protect its owners from harm in times of danger.

Due in no small measure to its protected mountainous location, Saidnaya enjoyed religious peace throughout its history, even during times of war, such as during the Crusades. Local Muslims visit the convent sanctuary on the day of Friday prayers and share in the legends regarding this holy place. Christians and Muslims from the region and from far away places seek the shrine for healing. Numerous accounts of miraculous healings have been reported, some which are documented in writing by those who experienced them throughout history.

Saidnaya has about more than 40 chapels and monasteries and the most famous one is the convent of the Virgin Mary. Many other Catholic, Eastern Orthodox, Syriac Catholic and Syriac Orthodox churches and monasteries have been built in Saidnaya throughout history. On top of the highest mountain in Saidnaya is the Cherubim Monastery at 2,000 metres (6,561.68 feet) above sea level, overlooking Damascus' fertile plains and Lebanon's mountains. There is also the Monastery of Mar Thomas and a few massive monasteries built more recently such as St. Thomas Creek Catholic Monastery, St. Estphariuos Orthodox Monastery, and St. Ephram Syriac Monastery. A bronze statue of Jesus Christ with 33.10 m high, was installed on 14 October 2013 financed by both the Russian Orthodox Church and the Russian government, The statue is near the Monastery of the Cherubim, perched above the historic pilgrimage route from Constantinople to Jerusalem.

The weather is cold and snowy in winter, while it is warm and has fresh air in summer. Surviving vestiges of caves, grottos and ancient places in and around Saydnaya indicate that it was inhabited by different civilizations from the early Stone Age, with artifacts from Aramaic, Greek, Syriac, Roman, and Arab times.

== History ==
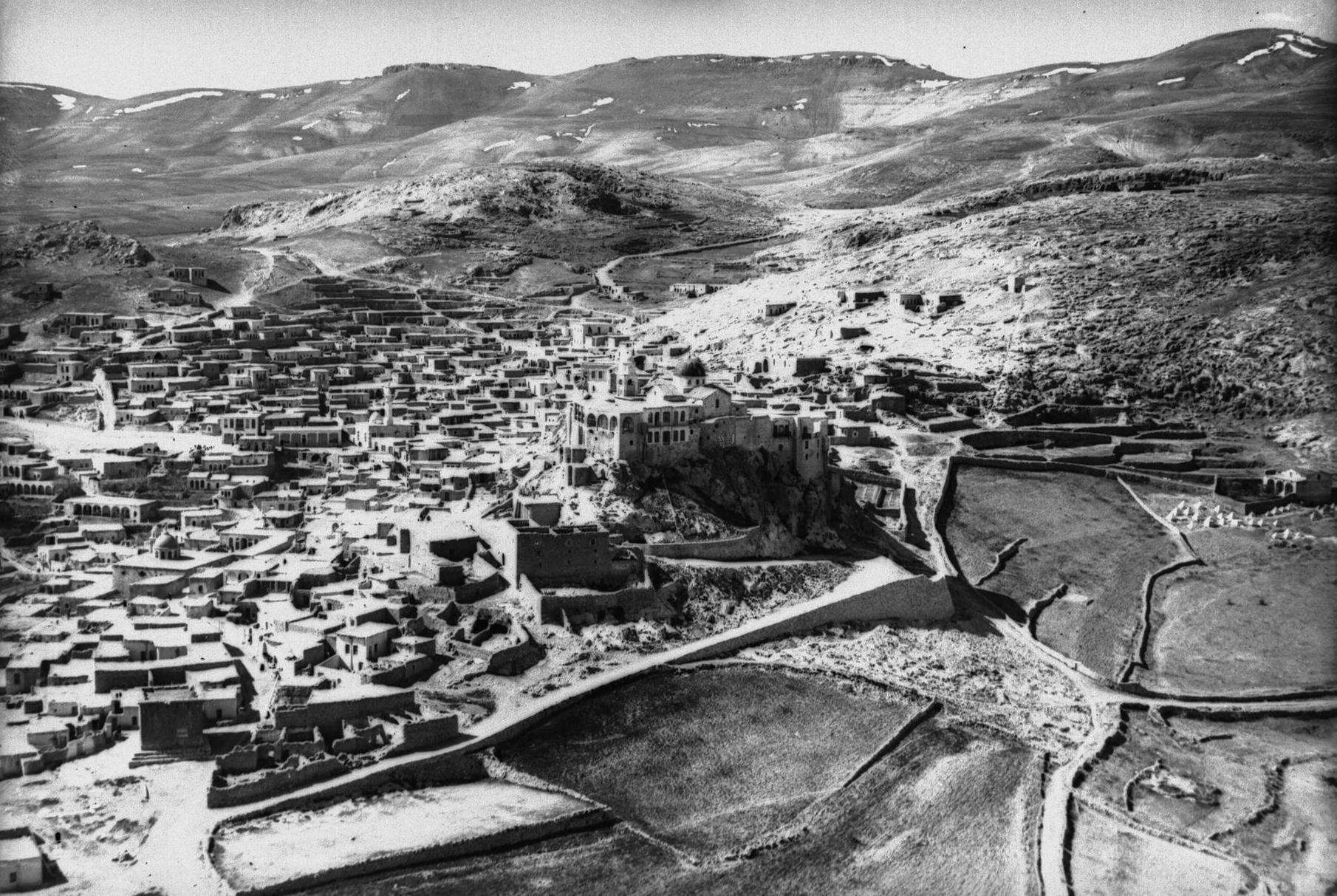
View of the city in 1930

Saidnaya's origins are in ancient times, and the town has been inhabited since at least the sixth century BC when it was known by its Aramaic name, Danaba. It emerged as an important center of Christianity well before it was adopted as the official religion of the Roman Empire. Macarius, the first bishop of Aleppo and later the Patriarch of Antioch, lists Saidnaya in a seventeenth-century Arabic manuscript as one of the seven ancient episcopal cities under Damascus, the same cities represented at the First Council of Nicaea in 325 AD.

=== Icon of the All-Holy Virgin ===
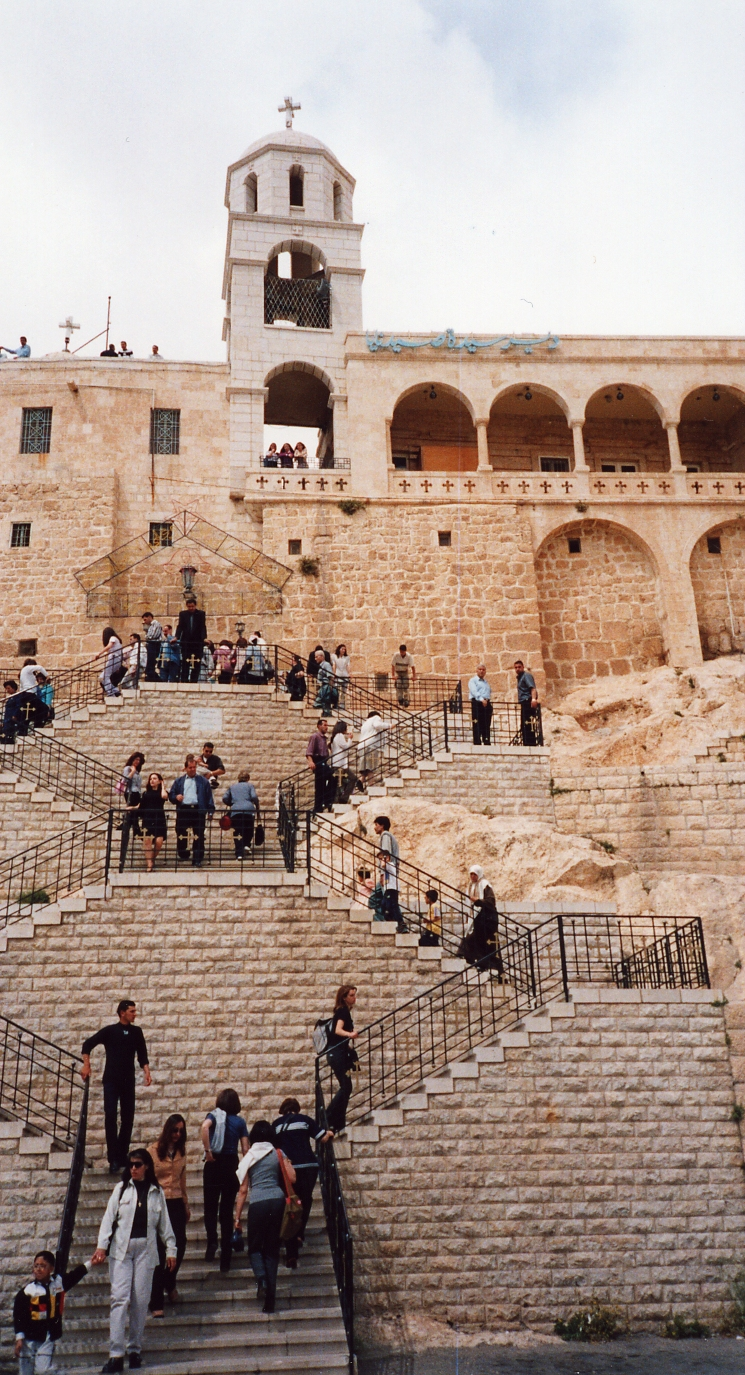
The Convent of Our Lady of Saidnaya

In the late 8th century, a certain venerable Marina was abbess of the convent, and she was widely revered for her piety and sanctity of life. It happened that a hermit monk, a Greek pilgrim from Egypt named Theodore, stopped at the convent on his way to the Holy Land. When he was leaving, Abbess Marina asked him to buy in Jerusalem a precious and fine icon of the Holy Virgin. While at Jerusalem, he utterly forgot the task entrusted to him and started on his return journey. However, when he had not gone far from the city, he was stopped short by an unfamiliar voice: "Have you not forgotten something in Jerusalem? What have you done in regard to the commission from Abbess Marina?" Monk Theodore returned at once to Jerusalem and found an icon of the Theotokos. During the journey back to the convent, he was astounded by the miracles accomplished through the icon. He and his whole caravan were ambushed by bandits, and then attacked by wild beasts. Amidst these dangers, the hermit always invoked the aid of the Holy Virgin while holding her icon, and he and all the caravan were saved from every peril.

These events tempted him to keep the valuable icon for himself, and he decided to bypass Saidnaya and sail back to Egypt. However, he was unable to set sail, for such a fierce storm arose, it seemed the ship would inevitably sink. His conscience was pricked, and he quickly left the ship and returned by way of Saidnaya. After spending four days in the convent, he was again possessed by an irresistible desire to make the icon of the Mother of God his own. He apologized to the abbess, pretending that he had been unable to buy the required icon, and then he decided to leave the convent secretly. The next morning, as he was about to set out on the journey back to his own country and approached the convent gate, he was amazed to find that an invisible power barred his way, and it was as though a stone wall stood where the gate should have been. After many futile attempts, he was forced to hand the icon over to the abbess, confessing his intention. With tears of gratitude she glorified the Lord and His All-pure Mother. Today the holy Icon is visited by pilgrims seeking the Virgin Mary's blessings as it is believed to grant (or at least intercede for) healing and fertility miracles. It is notable that Syrian Muslims often visit and pray before the Icon as well.

=== Crusader period ===
Magister Thietmar, a German pilgrim, wrote of his pilgrimage to Saidnaya, devoting four pages to a description of the icon of Holy Mother and Child found at the convent. He describes the origin story behind the icon and its special properties, and how a holy oil emitted from the breasts of the Virgin Mary is believed to be a miraculous oil that can heal the sick. In September 1240, after Thibaut de Champagne concluded a treaty with the sultan of Egypt, the Benedict of Alignan made a pilgrimage to St. Mary's of Saidnaya with the sultan's permission. The trip is seen as evidence of both Saidnaya's importance to Christian pilgrims in the thirteenth century and the relative safety of travel for Christians in Muslim areas during this time.

Chronicles from the thirteenth century also report that Templar Knights would go to the mountain monastery in Saidnaya to collect holy oil for Templar churches in Europe.

=== Modern era ===
In 1838, Eli Smith noted Saidanaya as being populated by Sunni Muslims and Antiochian Greek Christians. The Hollywood actor Michael Ansara was born in Saidnaya in 1922.

== See also ==
- Christians in Syria

== Bibliography ==
- Folda, J. (2005). Crusader Art in the Holy Land: From the Third Crusade to the Fall of Acre, 1187-1291. Cambridge University Press. ISBN 978-0-521-83583-1.
- Pasquale Castellana, Alessandro Di Bennardo, Romualdo Fernandez Ferreira, Deir Mar Touma di Saydnaia, luogo pagano e cristiano, edizioni Centro di Studi Orientali al Musky, Cairo 2007.
- Garrett, Paul D.; Purpura, Kathleen A. (2007). Frank Maria: A Search for Justice and Peace in the Middle East. AuthorHouse. ISBN 978-1-4343-0000-3.
- Mannheim, Ivan (2001). Syria & Lebanon Handbook: The Travel Guide. Footprint Travel Guides. ISBN 978-1-900949-90-3.
- Nicolle, D.; Turner, Graham; Hook, Christa (2005). Acre 1291: Bloody Sunset of the Crusader States. Osprey Publishing. ISBN 978-1-84176-862-5.
- Pitard, Wayne Thomas (1987), Ancient Damascus: A Historical Study of the Syrian City-State from Earliest Times Until Its Fall to the Assyrians in 732 B.C.E, EISENBRAUNS, ISBN 978-0-931464-29-4
- Porter, J.L. (1855). Five Years in Damascus: Including an Account of the History, Topography, and Antiquities of that City. J. Murray.
- Pringle, D. (1993). "Saidnaiya: Monastery Church of Our Lady of Sardenay (No. 198)". The Churches of the Crusader Kingdom of Jerusalem: A Corpus. Cambridge University Press. pp. 219-220. ISBN 978-0-521-39037-8.
- Waddy, C. (1980). Women in Muslim History. Longman. ISBN 978-0-582-78084-2.
- Vasilakē, Maria (2005). Images of the Mother of God: Perceptions of the Theotokos in Byzantium. Ashgate Publishing, Ltd. ISBN 978-0-7546-3603-8.
