= Statue of Jesus (Saidnaya) =

Colossal statue in Syria

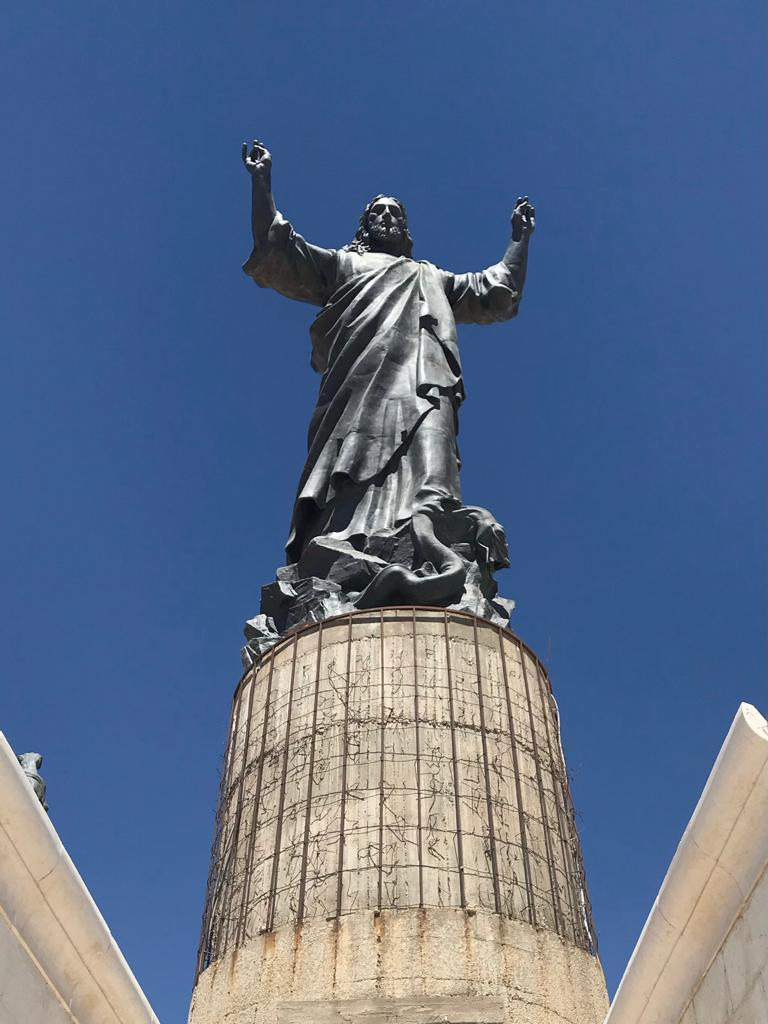
- Statue of Jesus in August 2018
- 33.72801°N 36.37282°E
- Location: Saidnaya, Syria
- Designer: Artush Papoian
- Type: Statue
- Material: Bronze
- Height: 32 metres (105 ft)
- Completion date: 14 October 2013

The Statue of Jesus in Saidnaya, titled I Have Come to Save the World, is the tallest Jesus Christ statue in the Middle East. It was installed on 14 October 2013, which coincided with the Intercession of the Theotokos, a feast day for Orthodox Christians. The figure is 12.3 metres (40ft) tall and stands on a base that brings its height to 32 metres.

== Location ==
The statue, arms outstretched, is located on a historic pilgrim route from Constantinople to Jerusalem, near the Cherubim Monastery in the community of Saidnaya, about 17 miles north of the city of Damascus, at an altitude of 6,889 feet (2,100 m) above sea level.

The ensemble with the blessing Christ in its center, seen from Lebanon, Jordan, Palestine and Israel, is designed to bring peace, mutual understanding, and hope for common salvation to a region engulfed in the flames of war.

— The Moscow Spiritual Academy, Interfax

== Construction ==
The statue was created by Armenian sculptor Artush Papoian, and was the brainchild of Yury Gavrilov, a 49-year-old man from Moscow who runs the London-based organization St Paul & St George Foundation. The Foundation, which Samir Shakib El-Gabban directs, was previously named the Gavrilov Foundation, after Yury Gavrilov.

After this idea emerged in 2005 it was blessed by Patriarch Ignatius IV of Antioch and the Middle East, who was the author of this idea, Jesus Christ who is offering his blessings is trampling upon a snake, which is the symbol of evil. There is Adam on his right side and Eve on his left side. The Patriarch of Antioch chose the Cherubim Mountain because Cherub, as is known, is a symbol taken from the Old Testament, which is used by the Christians and which is accepted by the believers of Islam.

— Samir Shakib El-Gabban, Voice of Russia

Priests, theologians from the Trinity Lavra of St. Sergius in Russia and Artush Papoian were part of the eight-year project started in 2005. By 2012, the statue which was assembled in Armenia was ready, but Syria was in civil war, causing the project's biggest delay. After securing the area, the statue was shipped from Armenia to Lebanon, then eventually reached Syria to be installed in October 2013.

== See also ==
- List of statues of Jesus
- List of tallest statues
