= Sana'a Mehaidli =

Lebanese female suicide bomber and SSNP member (1968–1985)

- Mehaidli in her SSNP uniform
- Born: 14 August 1968; Anqoun, Sidon District, South Governorate, Lebanon
- Died: 9 April 1985 (aged 16); Jezzine, Jezzine District, South Governorate
- Cause of death: Suicide bombing
- Organization: Syrian Social Nationalist Party

Sana'a Youssef Mehaidli (Arabic: سناء يوسف محيدلي, romanized: Sanāʼ Yūsef Meḥaydlī; 14 August 1968 – 9 April 1985) was a Lebanese militant and member of the Syrian Social Nationalist Party (SSNP). At the age of 16, she was killed when she exploded her car next to an Israeli convoy in Jezzine, Lebanon, during the South Lebanon conflict. Two Israeli soldiers and a Lebanese soldier were killed in the attack. Mehaidli is believed to be the first female suicide bomber.

== Early life ==
Mehaidli was born on 14 August 1968 in the Lebanese village of Anqoun to a Shia Muslim family. According to some other sources, she was born into a Christian family. She lived with her family in the Mousaitbeh area of Beirut. Mehaidli left school to work in a video rental shop where she became acquainted with members of the Syrian Social Nationalist Party (SSNP) who would frequent her store. Mehaidli fulfilled requests from SSNP members to copy a video cassette featuring an interview with Wajdi Al-Sayegh prior to his death in a suicide attack and was brought to tears each time she watched it; her boss noted that the interview had a profound effect on Mehaidli. She joined the SSNP in 1984 and began participating in Lebanese National Resistance Front activities in 1985.

On 24 March 1985, Mehaidli left her family home after she claimed she was going to buy nail polish for her mother. When she did not return that night, her family searched for her with security services and concluded that she had left to secretly marry. Mehaidli had instead embarked on a training course where she learnt to shoot firearms; she also learnt how to drive a car in five days.

== Suicide bombing ==
On 9 April 1985, Mehaidli drove a Peugeot 504 loaded with 440 pounds of explosives into an Israeli checkpoint near the village of Jezzine. The incident took place at the main crossing point from central to southern Lebanon. Mehaidli slipped through the crossing gate where passenger vehicles were not permitted to cross by driving directly behind an Israeli convoy. A guard at the crossing ordered Mehaidli to stop but she sped into a group of guards and detonated the explosives. The blast killed Mehaidli, two Israeli soldiers and a Druze member of the South Lebanon Army. Two other Israeli soldiers were injured.

The state-run television of Beirut ran a film showing Mehaidli in which she talked about her suicide mission prior to leaving for it. She explained that she decided on martyrdom because she experienced the "misery of [her] countrymen under the occupation." Mehaidli said that she was going to join "other martyrs" and named several men who died in suicide attacks on Israelis the previous year. Mehaidli's video was believed to be the first instance of a person being interviewed for television prior to their participation in a suicide attack. Mehaidli was nicknamed the "Bride of the South" by Beirut newspapers. She may have been the first female suicide bomber, according to some researchers.

After her death, a party official from the SSNP delivered a present to Mehaidli's home which she had left for her mother. It contained perfume, a blue necklace and a letter which Mehaidli wrote explaining her actions. The SSNP official said that Mehaidli's suicide was her own idea.
