= Juliette Elmir =

Lebanese nurse and political activist

- جوليات المير سعادة
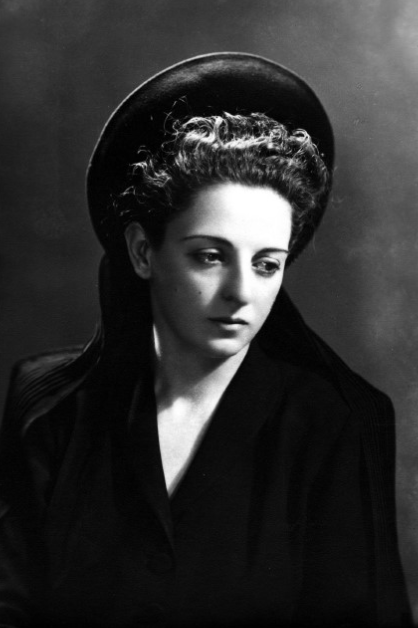
- Born: 1909; Tripoli, Lebanon
- Died: 24 June 1976 (aged 66–67); Beirut, Lebanon
- Political party: Syrian Social Nationalist Party
- Spouse: Antoun Sa’adeh

Signature
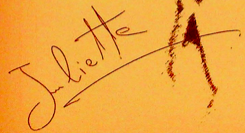

Juliette Elmir (Arabic: جوليات المير سعادة) (c. 1909 – 24 June 1976) was a Lebanese nurse and political activist. She was married to Antoun Sa’adeh, founder of the Syrian Social Nationalist Party (SSNP), and worked for the party. She became the first woman political prisoner in post Sykes-Picot Syria.

== Early life ==
Elmir was born in Tripoli in 1909. She emigrated with her family to Argentina as a child, where she trained as a nurse and began training to become a doctor.

== Marriage ==
Antoun Sa'adeh, who had secretly founded the Syrian Social Nationalist Party (SSNP) in 1932, fled to Argentina in 1938 after facing political persecution from French colonial authorities. Elmir met him in 1939 and they began corresponding. Their date of marriage is unclear, recorded in various sources as 1940, 1941 or 1943, but they are known to have lived in San Miguel de Tucumán and had three children. Sofia and Elissar were born in Argentina, and Raghida was born in Lebanon.

After World War II and the country's independence from the French Mandate, Elmir and her husband returned to Lebanon in 1947, settling in Dhour Al-Shweir.

== Revolution ==
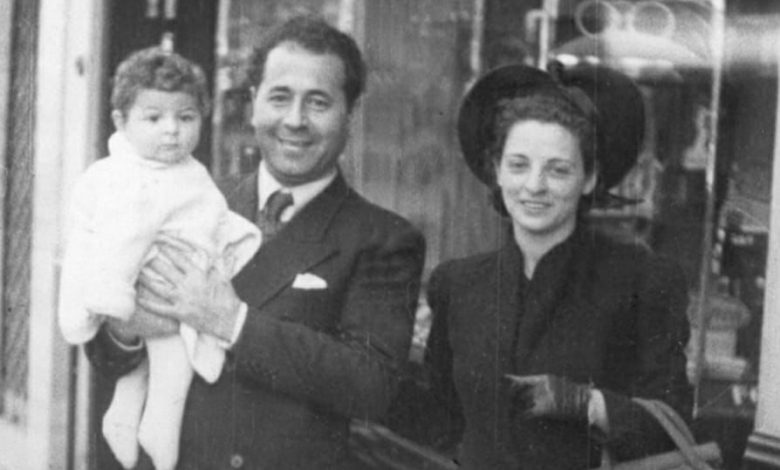
Antoun Sa'adeh and Elmir in Buenos Aires, Argentina, in 1943

In 1949, a revolution was declared against the Lebanese government, which ultimately failed. Elmir and her family fled to Syria, whose president Husni al-Za'im had agreed to meet them. However, al-Za'im handed them over to the Lebanese authorities. Elmir and their daughters was held at the Greek Orthodox Our Lady of Saidnaya Monastery, where she learned that in less than 24 hours her husband and many of his followers were judged by a Lebanese military court and executed by a firing squad.

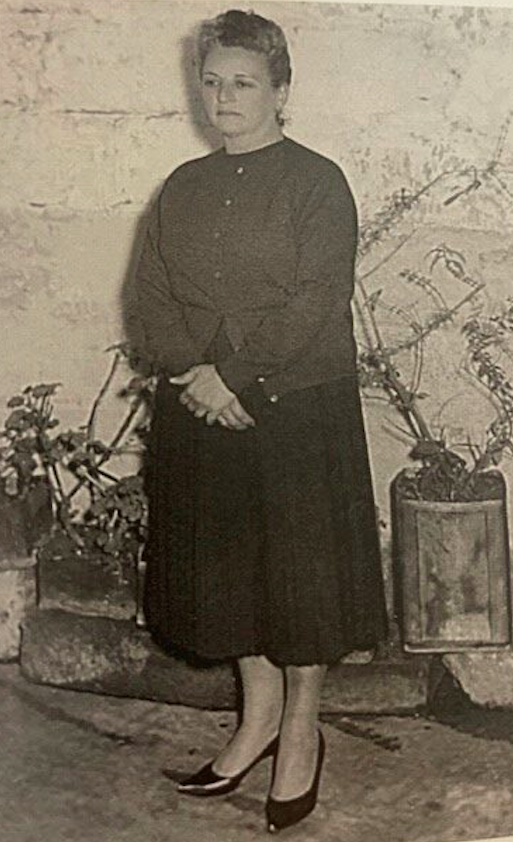
Elmir in prison, in 1961

Shortly after his death, Elmir was appointed al-Amina al-ula (First Keeper or First Trustee) of the SSNP, and her home became the SSNP's headquarters under the leadership of George Abd Messih. The SSNP allowed women to participate in activism and politics, setting a trend for the social norms for women in politics in the Levant.

== Imprisonment ==
Elmir became the first woman political prisoner in the Arab World, post Sykes-Picot Syria and the partitioning of the region. In 1955, she was accused of being involved in the assassination of the deputy chief of staff of the Syrian Army, Adnan al-Malki. Her property and belongings were confiscated and she was sentenced to life imprisonment in the Qala’at Dimashq (Citadel of Damascus). She was imprisoned for over ten years, but was released on 26 December 1963 on health grounds. She went into exile for a time in Paris, France. She lived there with her middle daughter Elissar.

== Death and legacy ==
She died in 1976 in Beirut. Her memoirs were posthumously published in 2004 and have been translated by Mazen Naous, Professor of the University of Massachusetts Amherst.
