= Battle of Sadad =

Part of the Syrian civil war

Coordinates: 34.2420°N 37.0500°E

- Part of the Syrian civil war and the persecution of Christians by the Islamic State
Date	21–28 October 2013 (1 week)
Location	Sadad, Syria
Result	Syrian government victory

Belligerents
Al-Nusra Front; Islamic State of Iraq and the Levant	(Syria) Syrian Government; Syrian Social Nationalist Party

Units involved
Unknown	Syrian Armed Forces; Syrian Army; Eagles of the Whirlwind

Strength
2,000 fighters	1,000 soldiers

Casualties and losses
100+ killed	100+ killed
- 46 civilians killed, 30 wounded, 10 missing

The Battle of Sadad was fought during the Syrian Civil War, in October 2013, when jihadist forces attacked the town of Sadad, an Orthodox-Christian majority town. 46 local men, women, and children were killed during the battle.

== Battle ==
On 21 October 2013, the town, which is strategically located between the city of Homs city and the capital Damascus, was reportedly overrun by Islamist militants belonging to the al-Nusra Front. The assault started when two al-Nusra suicide bombers detonated near a gas well, outside the town capturing it as well. At the time of the attack, no government military or militia forces were in the town, except local police. Saadad fell without a fight with the police station surrendering. After capturing Sadad, the militants set up loudspeakers in the main square, calling for residents to return to their houses. At least nine people were killed after being found in the streets. Opposition activists claimed the attack was not religiously motivated but rather it was conducted for military reason. However, following the battle, the bodies of almost 50 civilians were discovered in Saadad, including those of seven people, three of them children, in a well. Medical supplies within the town's hospital and the presence of a military depot nearby were also seen as possible reasons for the raid.

At the start of the rebel offensive, there were instances of rebels evicting civilians from their homes and turning them into military positions. Rebels also reportedly used civilians as human shields during the battle.

By the morning of 22 October, the rebels seemingly abandoned the town and Syrian Army forces were sent in to retake it. It soon became apparent that the militants went into hiding in the orchards and fields and ambushed the Army as it approached.

On 23 October, rebels pressed their advance and seized control of Army positions near the weapons depots, by the village of Mahin. As they advanced, the Syrian Air Force launched air-strikes.

On 25 October, AP reported that hundreds of civilians were trapped in Saadad, with Archbishop Silwanos Al-Nemeh saying that the situation was dire and that they were in fear of a massacre. Also, opposition fighters entered the Mar Theodore Church damaging it and stealing Church items.

On 26 October, a rebel battalion commander was killed in the clashes in Mahin and Sadad. Fighting was also taking place in the Hawarin and al-Hadath areas. Some Saadad residents were able to flee the neighbourhoods controlled by Jabhat al-Nusra, which were being bombarded by Army artillery.

By 28 October, the Army had taken back control of Sadad with the militants retreating from the town. The bodies of 46 civilians, including 15 women, were discovered in Sadad after the rebels pulled back. The opposition activist group the SOHR called it a massacre. 30 of the dead were reportedly found in two mass graves. Another 10 civilians remained missing. More than 100 government soldiers and 100 rebels, including 80 jihadists from ISIS and al-Nusra, were killed in the fighting. Foreign rebel fighters were also among the dead. The rebels retreated to the surrounding farmland, with the military in pursuit, and the government news agency reported that the militants had vandalized Sadad's Saint Theodor Church and much of its infrastructure.

== After the battle ==
One week after the Army recaptured Saadad, on 4 November, the military also captured the al-Hazm al-Wastani area, which is by Mahin and Sadad. A day after the capture, the head of the Syrian Social Nationalist Party from Sadad was killed during fighting with rebels in the surrounding countryside.

On 5 November, rebels launched a large attack on the weapons depot at Mahin during which 50 rebels and 20 soldiers were killed. The next day, the SOHR reported that opposition forces managed to capture several buildings in the 30-building complex and seize a large quantity of weapons. A government source denied both the capture and the seizure and stated fighting was still ongoing.

On 15 November, government forces recaptured the weapons depot, as well as the nearby town of al-Hadath and the village of Howarin. A rebel commander was killed during the last day of fighting in the area.
