= Battle of Maaloula =

2013 battle of the Syrian Civil War

Coordinates: 33.8333°N 36.5500°E

- Part of the Syrian Civil War
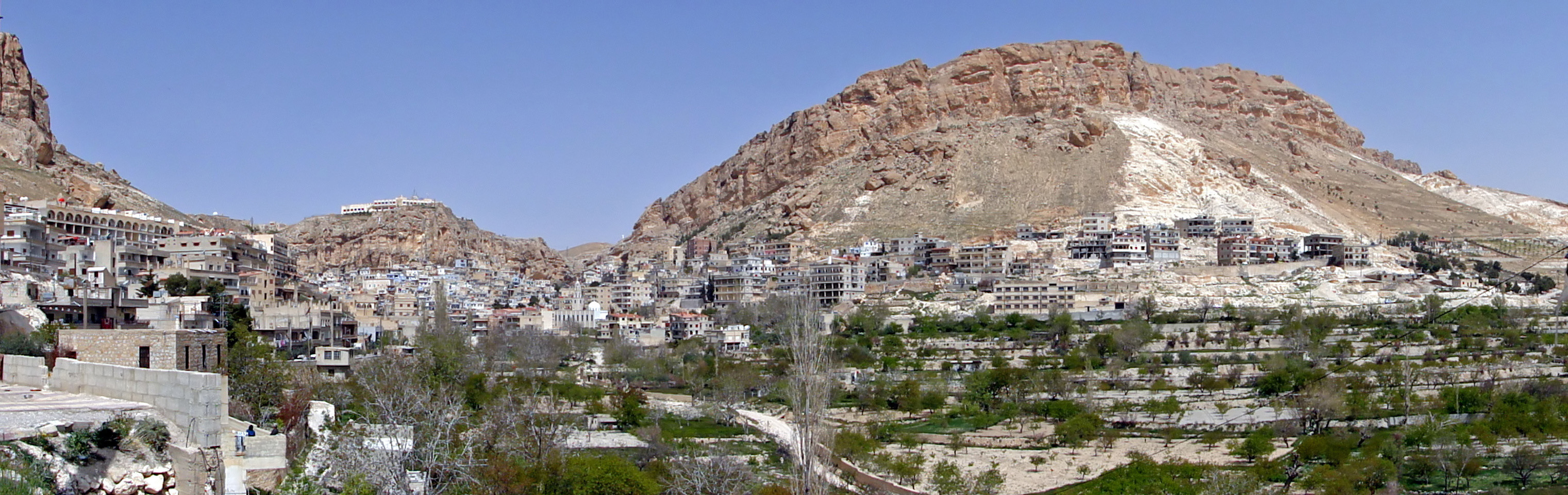
- Overview of Maaloula
Date	4–15 September 2013 (1 week and 4 days)
Location	Maaloula, Syria
Result	Syrian government victory
Territorial changes	The Syrian Army restores control of Maaloula

Belligerents
Syrian opposition; Free Syrian Army; Ahrar al-Sham; Al-Nusra Front	(Syria) Syrian government Syrian Social Nationalist Party; Hezbollah

Commanders and leaders
Abu Khaled (Baba Amr Revolutionaries Brigade commander)	Unknown

Units involved
Free Syrian Army; Ahfad al-Rasul Brigades; Qalamoun Liberation Front; Baba Amr Revolutionaries Brigade; Farouq Brigades	Syrian Armed Forces; Syrian Army; 3rd Armoured Division; 81st Armoured Brigade; 11th Armoured Division; 67th Armoured Brigade; 155th Army Brigade; National Defense Forces; Popular Committees; Eagles of the Whirlwind

Strength
~400	3,000

Casualties and losses
19+ killed, 150 wounded	8+ killed
- At least twenty civilians executed and six kidnapped by Al-Nusra militants

The Battle of Maaloula took place during the Syrian Civil War fought in September 2013, when rebel forces attacked the town of Maaloula, a Christian majority town in which the population speaks mainly Western Neo-Aramaic. The town is located 56 km to the northeast of Damascus, and built into the rugged mountainside, at an altitude of more than 1500 metres.

== Background ==
According to the information from residents, Al-Qaeda linked jihadist group Al-Nusra Front had been based in the mountains near the Safir hotel since March 2013. It was reported that the jihadists were harassing the Christian people of the village since then. It was also reported that a Christian farmer could not go up to the area to farm his land, located near the hotel, unless he was accompanied by a Muslim resident of the village. He was not seen since.

== Battle ==
=== Jihadist attack ===
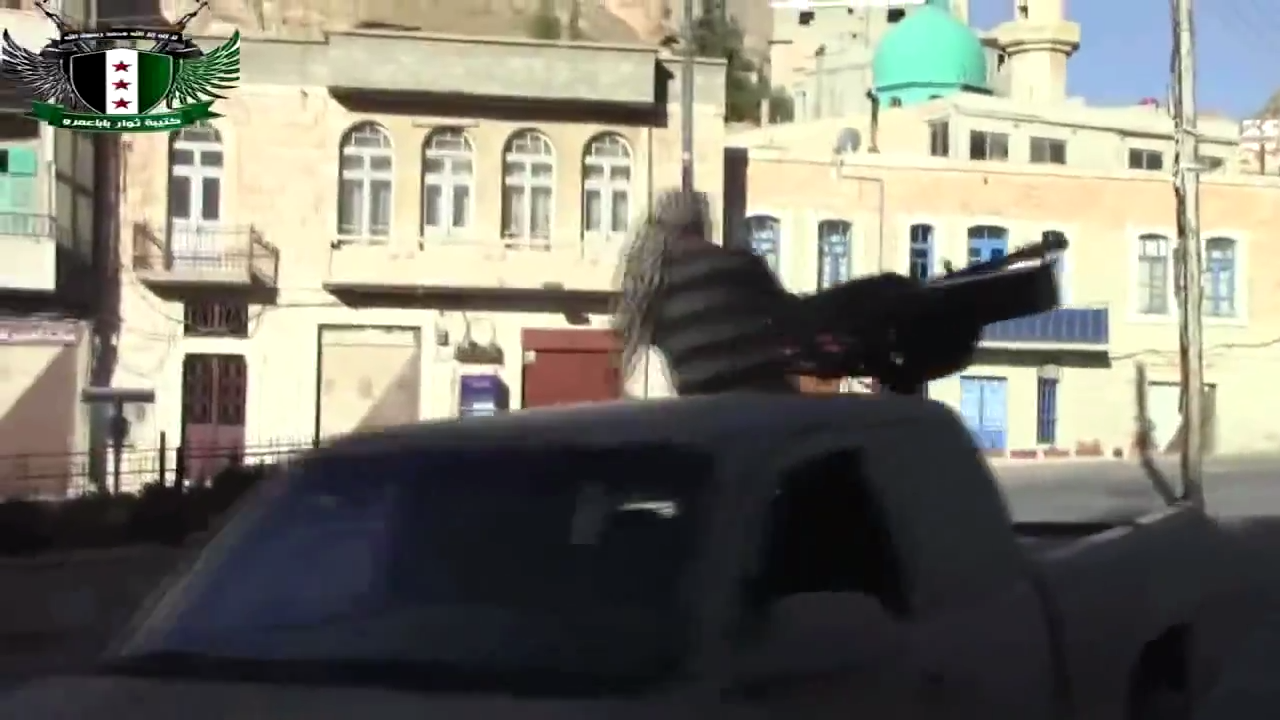
A rebel technical armed with a DShK fire at government forces during the first rebel attack on Ma'loula on 4 September.

On 4 September, a truck driven by a Jordanian suicide bomber exploded near a checkpoint of the Syrian Army at the entrance of Maaloula. The explosion gave the signal for the attack. The jihadists took control of the checkpoint, killing eight soldiers and disabling two tanks, according to opposition sources, while the Syrian Air Force led three raids against the checkpoint after its capture. During the fighting, jihadists captured the Safir hotel and used it to fire in the direction of the community below. At the end of the day, rebels took control of several segments of this historical town.

=== Army counter-attack ===
On 6 September, the Syrian Army sent reinforcements, including tanks and armored personnel carriers, to regain control of parts of the town, while the rebels retreated. The Army reinforced the checkpoint that was attacked by the Jordanian suicide bomber, while fighting erupted around Maaloula after the jihadists retreated.

On 7 September, fighting resumed around Maaloula after the Syrian army attacked jihadist fighters stationed in a hotel on a nearby hill.

=== New jihadist attack ===
On 8 September, however it was reported jihadist forces had retaken Maaloula after they received reinforcements and were able to force the Army to retreat from the town. During the day's fighting, 18 jihadists were killed and 100 wounded. A resident of Maaloula reported that the jihadists attacked Christian homes and killed several people. They also torched a church and looted another one, and threatened several Christian villagers with beheading if they did not convert to Islam. Although, a local nun who spoke to the BBC denied reports of forced conversion and persecution of Christians. Many of Maaloula's residents fled, while Muslim residents reportedly welcomed the entry of jihadist and insurgent forces. A woman from the village said to Lebanese media that her husband, a member of the town's militia, had his throat cut by Free Syrian Army jihadists. According to a jihadists brigade leader, the Army was still present at one of the entrances of Maaloula. At the end of the afternoon, the Army and the Popular Committees militias were fighting jihadists to regain control of the town with clashes around Maaloula and in the neighbouring Jarajafa area.

=== New Army counter-attack ===
On 9 September, Syrian troops launched an offensive to retake the town and jihadist-held positions in the surrounding hills. From the 3,300 inhabitants of the town, only 50 had remained during the fighting, according to a resident, who spoke on condition of anonymity for fear of reprisals from jihadists. A church was burnt in the western part of the village. Some residents affirm that their families had been forced to leave the town by the jihadists, while others said that jihadists forced one person to convert to Islam at gunpoint and executed another.

On 10 September, jihadist forces declared their withdrawal from Maaloula under the condition that the Army and pro-government militias would also not enter the town. However, by the next day, the jihadists had not retreated and fighting inside the town was still going on. Later in the day, government forces had captured large parts of the town.

On 15 September, the military secured Maaloula.

== Aftermath ==
On 29 November, a coalition of rebels including Jabhat al-Nusra swept into Maaloula from the surrounding hills after rolling explosive laden tires onto government forces below. During the proceeding weekend, twelve nuns from the Greek Orthodox monastery of Mar Takla were kidnapped and taken toward the border town of Yabroud. At the time the kidnappers claimed that they were not abducting the nuns. However, two months later the nuns were ransomed in exchange for government held prisoners. The number of prisoners exchanged is contested; the government said 25 prisoners were exchanged while the opposition stated the number was 150.

On 14 April 2014, with the help of Hezbollah, the Syrian Army once more took control of Maaloula. This government success was part of a string of other successes in the strategic Qalamoun region, including the seizure of the former rebel bastion of Yabroud in the previous month.
