= Thietmar (pilgrim) =

Medieval German pilgrim

Start of Thietmar's account in the manuscript Herzog August Bibliothek Wolfenbüttel, Cod. Guelf. 42.3 Aug. 2° from the 15th century. The text begins Ego Thetmaro ("I, Thietmar") with the initial E in red.

Thietmar or Dithmar was a German Christian pilgrim who visited the Holy Land in 1217–1218 and wrote an account of his travels, the Liber peregrinationis.

According to his own account, Thietmar and a group of pilgrims set out from Germany "signed with and protected by the cross". This would seem to indicate that he was a crusader, a conclusion accepted by Jaroslav Folda, but his account indicates that he was an unarmed pilgrim. From his work it can be seen that he was an educated man. He is sometimes called magister (teacher, German Meister), but the better manuscript tradition does not contain this word. He was probably a churchman from Westphalia and the leader of his group. He has been called a Franciscan friar, but the Chronicle of Nicholas Glassberger, written between 1491 and 1508, calls him a monk. Glassberger also wrote that he prepared his book for Pope Honorius III, although Glassberger may have inferred this from the text itself. He also associates the pope's receipt of the book with the preaching of the Fifth Crusade, which had begun under his predecessor, Innocent III.

Thietmar's travels coincided with the outbreak of hostilities associated with the Fifth Crusade. He landed in Acre in the early summer or fall of 1217, when the city was already host to armies from Europe preparing to battle the Muslims. The truce was broken during his stay in the Holy Land and in several instances he was in a place just days or weeks before it saw serious fighting. In spite of this, Thietmar does not mention the crusade in his book.

Thietmar's sojourn in the Holy Land involved two pilgrimages. The first was to see the icon of the Virgin Mary in Our Lady of Saidnaya Monastery in Syria. Starting from Acre, he went by way of Nazareth, Cana, Mount Tabor, Nein and Tabgha to Tiberias, from where he followed the south shore of the Sea of Galilee, crossed the river Jordan and went by way of Nawā, Maliḥa, Ṣanamayn and Damascus to Saidnaya. From there he returned to Acre. He does not say by what route, presumably because it was the same one.

In 1218, he set out from Acre on a second pilgrimage to Saint Catherine's Monastery in the Sinai. His account of this trip is the most detailed description of a pilgrimage in the Sinai from the 12th or 13th century. From Acre he went south by the coastal road to Jaffa, then inland to Ramla, from where he headed directly towards Bethlehem. He avoided Jerusalem because the Muslim authorities were nervous about Christian pilgrims at that time. He and his party were arrested anyway and detained in the Asnerie, the former donkey stables of the Knights Hospitaller by the Church of Saint Stephen just outside the Jerusalem. They were released only through the intervention of some Hungarian Muslims known to one of his fellow captives. From there he continued on to Bethlehem, from where he made an excursion to Hebron before returning to Bethlehem. He visited Bethany, then Jericho, then crossed the Jordan, after which he says he visited Zoar and Ein Gedi west of the Dead Sea. Possibly he crossed the sea by boat, but more likely he was confused and in fact passed through Mount Nebo and Madaba before picking up the King's Highway. Guided by Bedouins, he followed this south through Heshbon, Rabba, Kerak, Shoubak, Petra, Mount Hor and the Arabah to Aqaba on the Red Sea coast. He followed the western coast passed Pharaoh's Island until coming to Saint Catherine's. Afterwards he returned to Acre, although he does not describe his return journey.

Thietmar's Liber peregrinationis ('book of the pilgrimage') survives in full or abbreviated in eighteen manuscripts. An abbreviated version from a 14th-century manuscript of Basel was published in 1844 and again in 1851. A 13th-century copy from Ghent was also published in 1851. These texts belong to a later abbreviated and interpolated recension along with manuscripts from Munich and Berlin. Manuscripts more faithful to the original are found in Hamburg, Berlin, Rostock and Wolfenbüttel. An edition based on the Hamburg copy appeared in 1852. A third recension, intermediate in quality, is represented by a single manuscript in Wrocław. The later pilgrim Burchard of Mount Sion made use of Thietmar's text in his own work.

== Editions ==
- J. A. Sprecher van Bernegg, ed. "Magister Thetmars Reise nach Palästina und Egypten, in Anfang des 13. Jahrhunderts". In H. M. Malten, ed. Neueste Weltkunde. Frankfurt, 1844, pp. 184–193. It reproduces only the first part of the travel report: Acre, Mt Tabor, Damascus, Mt Carmel, Jerusalem, Bethlehem, Mamre, Bethany, and Jericho.
- T. Tobler, ed. Magistri Thetmari iter ad Terram Sanctam anno 1217. St Gall, 1851.
- J. de Saint-Génois, ed. "Voyages faits en Terre Sainte par Thetmar en 1217 et par Burchard de Strasbourg en 1175 au 1225." Mémoires de l'Académie royale de Belgique 26 (1851), pp. 19–58.
- J. C. M. Laurent, ed. Magistri Thietmari historia de dispositione terre sancte. Hamburg, 1852.
  A translation of Laurent's edition can be found in Denys Pringle, trans., Pilgrimage to Jerusalem and the Holy Land, 1187–1291 (Ashgate, 2012), pp. 95–133.
