= Antoun Saadeh =

Lebanese politician, philosopher, and writer (1904–1949)

- أنطون سعادة
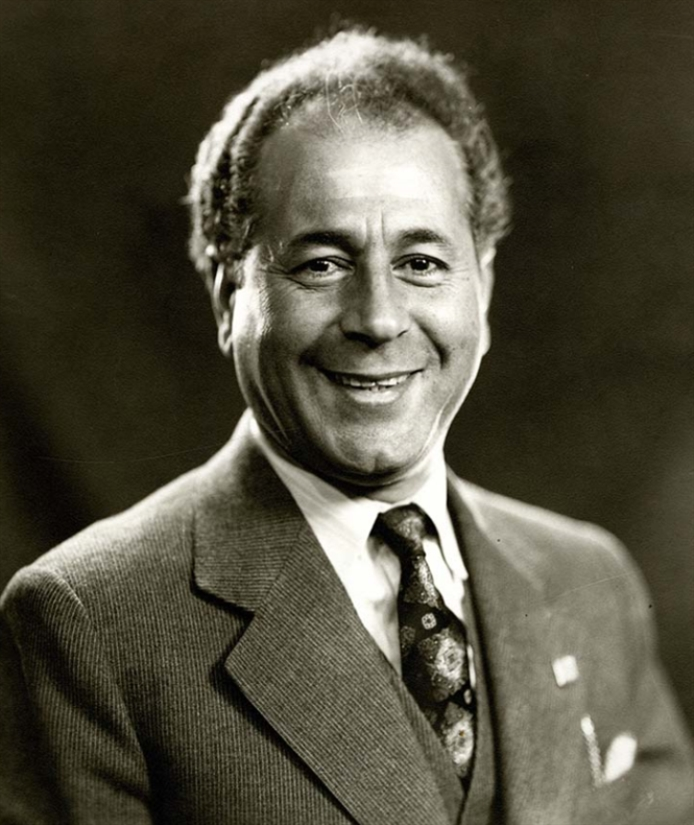
- Born: 1 March 1904; Dhour El Choueir, Mount Lebanon Mutasarrifate
- Died: 8 July 1949 (aged 45); Beirut, Lebanon
- Cause of death: Execution

Philosophical work
- Era: 20th-century philosophy
- Region: Middle Eastern philosophy
- School: Romanticism, Syrian nationalism, Welfare Chauvinism
- Main interests: Political philosophy, sociology, history, literature, fine arts
- Notable ideas: Natural Syria, Syrian nationalism
- Political party: Syrian Social Nationalist Party

Antoun Saadeh (Arabic: أنطون سعادة, romanized: ʾAnṭūn Saʿādah; 1 March 1904 – 8 July 1949) was a Lebanese politician, sociologist, philosopher and writer who founded the Syrian Social Nationalist Party.

== Life and career ==
=== Early life ===
Saadeh was born in 1904 in Dhour El Choueir, in the Mount Lebanon Mutasarrifate. He was the son of a Greek Orthodox Christian physician, Khalil Saadeh and Naifa Nassir Khneisser. His father was himself a Syrian nationalist as well as democracy advocate, and also an intellectual and author, who has been described as "a prolific writer and polymath, whose works span the fields of politics, literature, journalism, novel-writing, and translation". Antoun Saadeh completed his elementary education in his birth town and continued his studies at the Lycée des Frères in Cairo and came back to Lebanon at the death of his mother. In the later part of 1919, Saadeh immigrated to the United States, where he resided for approximately one year with his uncle in Springer, New Mexico and worked at a local train station. In February 1921, he moved to Brazil with his father, a prominent Arabic-language journalist. In 1924, Saadeh founded a secret society to unify Natural Syria. This society was dissolved the following year. Natural Syria, according to Saadeh, included the Levant; Palestine, Transjordan, Lebanon, and Syria, as well as Iraq, and parts of Southern Turkey. His concept of Syria included all religious, ethnic and linguistic groups in this region. During his time in Brazil, Saadeh learned German and Russian. Ultimately, he became a polyglot fluent in seven languages: Arabic, English, Portuguese, French, German, Spanish and Russian.

=== Activity in Lebanon ===
In July 1930, he returned to Lebanon. In 1931, he wrote "A Love Tragedy", which was first published with his "Story of the Holiday of Our Lady of Sidnaya" in Beirut in 1933. Also, in 1931, Saadeh worked at the daily newspaper Al-Ayyam; then, in 1932, he taught German at the American University of Beirut. In 1933, he continued to publish pamphlets in the Al-Majalia magazine in Beirut.

On 16 November 1932, Saadeh secretly founded the Syrian Social Nationalist Party. Three years later, on 16 November 1935, the party's existence was proclaimed, and Saadeh was arrested and sentenced to six years imprisonment by the French colonial powers. During his confinement, he wrote his first book, "The Rise of Nations". He was released from prison early but was again detained in June 1936, where he wrote another book, "Principles Explained". In November of the same year, he was released from prison, but in March 1937, he was arrested again. During the time he spent in prison, he wrote his third book, "The Rise of the Syrian Nation", but his manuscript was confiscated, and the authorities refused to return it to him.

=== Activity in exile ===
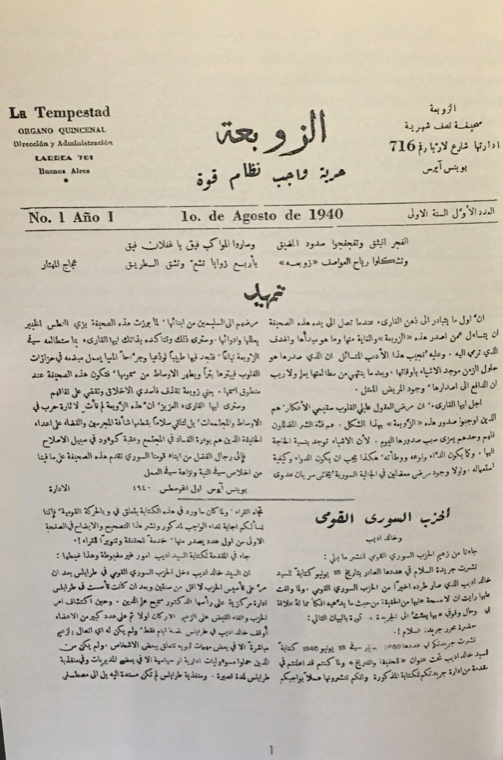
First number of Al-Zawba'a (The Storm) published on 1st August 1940.

He was released from prison in late May 1937. In November 1937, Saadeh founded the newspaper Al-Nahdhah. Saadeh led the party until 1938. Then, for the second time, he left the country to establish party branches in the Lebanese communities in South America. Saadeh went to Brazil and founded the newspaper New Syria. Soon afterwards, he was arrested by the French colonial authorities and spent two months in prison. In 1939, at the outbreak of World War II, Saadeh moved to Argentina, where he remained until 1947. In Argentina, Saadeh continued his activities. He founded Al-Zawba'a (The Storm) newspaper and wrote The Intellectual Conflict in Syrian Literature, which was printed in Buenos Aires. In 1943, Saadeh married Juliette al-Mir and had three daughters with her. The French colonial court sentenced him in absentia to twenty years of imprisonment.

=== Return to Lebanon and execution ===
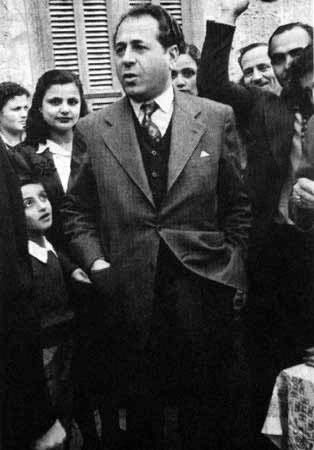
Saadeh in Lebanon

Saadeh returned to Lebanon on 2 March 1947, following the country's independence from France. After his return, he made a revolutionary speech, upon which the authorities issued an arrest warrant in force for seven months and withdrew. In Lebanon, Saadeh founded the newspaper Al-Jil Al-Jadid. On 4 July 1949, the party declared a revolution in Lebanon in retaliation for a series of provocations staged by the government of Lebanon against party members. The revolt was suppressed and Saadeh travelled to Damascus to meet with Husni al-Za'im, the President of Syria at the time, who had previously agreed to support him. However, he was handed over by al-Zai'm to the Lebanese authorities. Saadeh and many of his followers were judged by a Lebanese military court and executed by a firing squad, including Saadeh himself. The capture, trial and execution happened in less than 48 hours. Saadeh's execution took place at the dawn of 8 July 1949. According to Adel Beshara, it was and still is the shortest and most secretive trial given to a political offender.

His party continued to be active after his death. Saadeh's party supported the President of Lebanon Camille Chamoun during the 1958 Lebanon crisis. In 1961, the SSNP attempted a coup d'état against President Fuad Shihab, which failed. During the 1960s, party leaders were arrested, and the party was eventually splintered into separate factions.

=== Syrian Social Nationalist Party ===
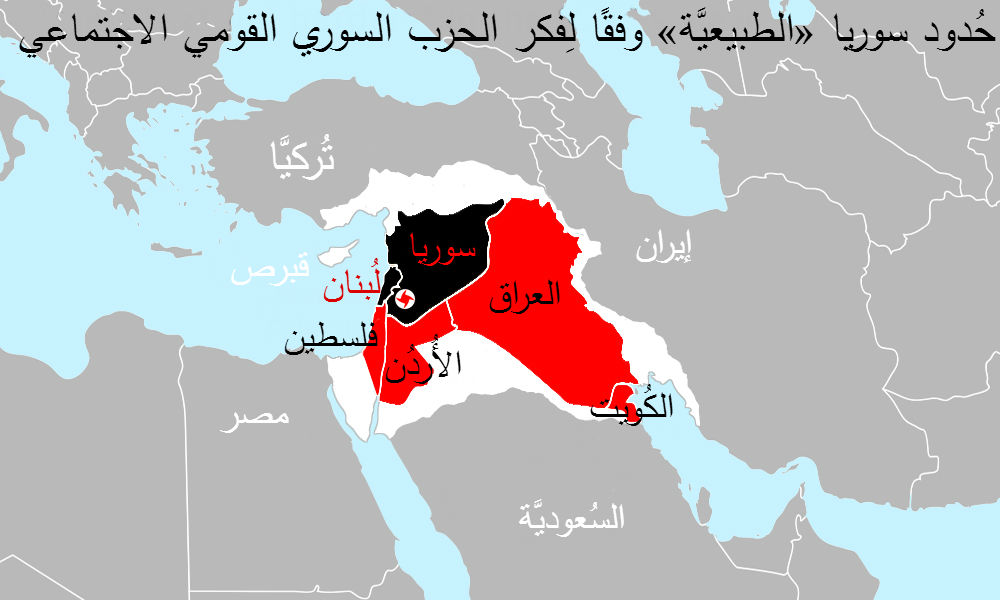
As envisioned by Saadeh and the SSNP, "Natural Syria" includes modern Syria, Lebanon, Israel, Palestine, Jordan, Iraq, Kuwait, Cyprus, the Sinai Peninsula, the Ahvaz region of Iran, and Cilicia in southern Anatolia.

The SSNP "Zawbaa" (Vortex, Tempest) is a glyph combining the Muslim crescent and the Christian cross, derived from Mesopotamian art. It symbolizes the blood shed by martyrs that makes the wheel of history whirl forward, dissipating the surrounding darkness (representing sectarianism, Ottoman occupation, and the colonial oppression that followed). Within the party, Saadeh gained a cult of personality and at the same time, Saadeh was named the party leader for life. However, according to Haytham, Saadeh stated that European fascism didn't influence him. Haytham claims that Saadeh's Syrian Social Nationalist ideology aimed at opposite ends.

Saadeh rejected Pan-Arabism (the idea that the speakers of the Arabic language form a single, unified nation) and argued instead for the creation of the state of United Syrian Nation or Natural Syria, encompassing the Fertile Crescent, making up a Syrian homeland that "extends from the Taurus range in the northwest and the Zagros mountains in the northeast to the Suez Canal and the Red Sea in the south and includes the Sinai Peninsula and the Gulf of Aqaba, and from the Syrian Sea in the west, including the island of Cyprus, to the arch of the Arabian Desert and the Persian Gulf in the east." (Kader, H. A.)

Film in Arabic about Saadeh's return to Lebanon.

Saadeh rejected both language and religion as defining characteristics of a nation and argued that nations develop through the common development of people inhabiting a specific geographical region. Thus, he was a strong opponent of Arab nationalism and Pan-Islamism. He argued that Syria was historically, culturally, and geographically distinct from the rest of the Arab world, which he divided into four parts. He traced Syrian history as a distinct entity back to the Phoenicians, Canaanites, Assyrians, Babylonians etc. and argued that Syrianism transcended religious distinctions.

Saadeh himself denied these claims of alleged National Socialist and Fascist ideology of his party. During a 1935 speech, Saadeh said: "I want to use this opportunity to say that the system of the Syrian Social Nationalist Party is neither a Hitlerite nor a Fascist one, but a pure social nationalist one. It is not based on useless imitation, but is instead the result of an authentic invention – which is a virtue of our people".

== Ideology ==
=== Philosophy ===
Al-Madrahiyyah consists of calling the nations to discard the doctrine which regards Spirit as the only motor of human progress, or Matter as the fundamental basis of human development; to give up once and for all the idea that the world is by necessity in a state of war in which spiritual forces are continuously fighting with material forces; and finally to admit with us that the basis of human development is spiritual-materialist and that superior humanity recognizes this basis and builds the edifice of the future on it. The world, which has come to realize, especially after the last world war [World War II], how destructive the partial philosophies and ideologies of capitalism, Marxism, fascism and national socialism have been, is today in need of a new social philosophy that can save it from the arbitrariness and error of these ideologies.

— Sa'adeh, Commentaries on the Ideology, p. 132.

Saadeh had a holistic notion of science, as "knowledge is that it revolves around the interaction of the self with the surrounding physical conditions" and was against epistemological reductionism, considering that "the self plays an active role in creating the conditions that transform things into objects of knowledge. As a social self, this self is the product of several dynamics – mind, intuition, the practical and existential. It does not depend on one factor and exclude the others." His whole thought was a refutation of the "individualist doctrine, whether in its sociological or methodological orientations". For him, the man was a totality by himself as much as in connection with his immediate surrounding, a social being but with his own dignity, which brings him closer to the personalism of someone like Nikolai Berdyaev. In his vision, the society's main role was to shape the individual being-as-relation through the Khaldunian notion of assabiya (solidarity), which, through some common features (geography, language, culture, ...) brings out the best in him, but without oppressing his liberties nor negligible either the spiritual or the material aspect, like he witnessed in contemporary ideologies such as communism, fascism or Nazism. Thus, "the concept of man-society is the axis of Sa'adeh’s theory of human existence. What is meant by this concept is that existence at a human level and existence at a social level are not independent phenomena; rather, they are one phenomenon, two aspects of the same social essence."

=== Nationalism ===
He had a regionalist vision of nationalism because he gave some utmost importance to geography: even if he was not an utmost environmental determinist, he thought that a man's relation with his milieu involves a particular way of acting because of the different climate, fauna or flora; men will manage their resources differently whether they're in mountains or desert, which will also have consequences on their interactions with foreign groups (over the control of the same resources and so on). Thus the notion of the homeland was dear to him. On racialism – which was associated with nationalism in many European ideologies -, "he argued that, contrary to common belief, race is a purely physical concept that has nothing to do with the psychological or social differences between human communities. People differ by their physical features – colour, height, and appearance – and are accordingly divided into races. Nationalism, however, cannot be founded on this reality. Every nation comprises diverse racial groups, and none is the product of one race or one specific tribe."

=== The socio-economic cycle ===
Contrarily to Zaki al-Arsuzi and other Arab nationalists who were influenced by European thinkers' vision of race and language – notably Fichte - Saadeh thus developed his vision, more inclusive and synthetic. It's a "dynamic theory of nationalism for the whole society based on the union in life and the socio-economic cycle (...) not deterministic. Land and people are two important ingredients of the nation. Still, they are not the nation themselves (...) is a civilizing theory because it recognizes the necessity and inevitability of interaction between nations (...) the interaction process has two poles: the first, economic possibilities of the environment, and the second, society’s ability to benefit from such possibilities (...) interaction takes place on two levels: horizontally, which determines the extent and character of regional interaction; and, vertically, between man and land, out of which a horizontal interaction may or may not occur (...) unlike Marxism, which reduced the economic question to one of class and considered the national question synonymous with the bourgeoisie, the concept of the socio-economic cycle is a societal concept (...) the mind is a primary factor in human progress. It is a liberating force and a complex entity that should not be viewed from just one angle. For Sa'adeh, the mind represents the liberation of human energy and its incorporation into the process of socio-economic interaction."

== Works ==
=== Books ===
- Nushu' al-Umam (The Rise of Nations), Beirut: n.p., 1938.
- An-Nizam al-Jadid (The Modern System), Beirut and Damascus: SSNP Publications, 1950–1956.
- Al-Islam fi Risalatein (Islam in its Two Messages), Damascus: n.p., 1954.
- Al-Sira' al-Fikri fial-Adab al-Suri (Intellectual Conflict in Syrian Literature), 3rd edition, Beirut: SSNP Publications, 1955.
- Al-Muhadarat al-Ashr (The Ten Lectures), Beirut: SSNP Publications, 1956.
- Shuruh fi al-Aqida (Commentaries on the Ideology), Beirut: SSNP Publications, 1958.
- Marhalat ma Qabl al-Ta'sis (1921–1932) (The Stage Prior to the Formation [of the SSNP]), Beirut: SSNP, 1975.
- Al-In'izaliyyah Aflasat (1947–1949), (Isolationism Has Gone Bankrupt), Beirut: SSNP Publications, 1976.
- Mukhtarat fi al-Mas'alah al-Lubnaniyyah (1936–1943) (Selections of the Lebanese Question), Beirut: SSNP Publications, 1976.
- Marahil al-Mas'alah al Filastiniyyah: 1921–1949 (The Stages of the Palestine Question), Beirut: SSNP Publications, 1977.
- Al-Rasa'il (Correspondences), Beirut: SSNP Publications, 1978–1990.
- Al-Athar al-Kamilah (Collected Works), Beirut: SSNP Publications, 1978–1995.
- A'da al-Arab A'da Lubnan (Enemies of Arabs, Enemies of Lebanon), Beirut: SSNP Publications, 1979.
- Al-Rassa'eel (Letters), Beirut: Dar Fikr for Research and Publication, 1989.
- Mukhtarat fi al-Hizbiyyah al-Dinniyyah (An Anthology on Religious Partisanship), Beirut: Dar Fikr, 1993.
- Al-Islam fi Risalateih al-Masihiyyah wal Muhammadiyyah (Islam in the Christian and Muhammadan Messages), 5th edition, Beirut: Al-Rukn, 1995.

=== Articles ===
- "The Opening of a New Way for the Syrian Nation", Al-Jumhur, Beirut, June 1937.
- "Political Independence in the Key to Economic Independence", Souria al-Jadida (New Syria), 30 September 1939.
- "the region of Syria", al-Zawbaπa, no. 63, 1 July 1943.
- "Haqq al-Siraπ Haqq al-Taqaddum" (The Right to Struggle is the Right to Progress), Kull Shay', 107, Beirut, 15 April 1949.

== See also ==
- Syrian Social Nationalist Party
- Adunis
