= Aanqoun =

Aanqoun عنقون
- Municipality
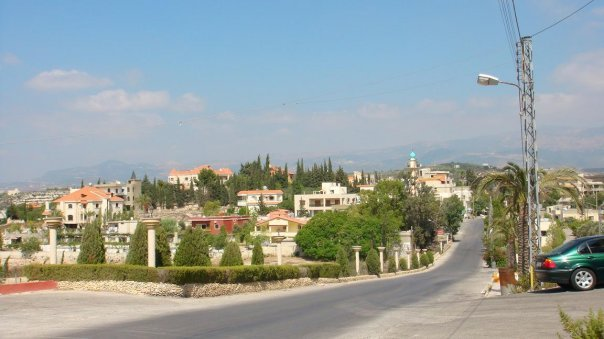
- The entrance of Aanqoun from the West Side

- Location in Lebanon
- Coordinates: 33°29′56″N 35°25′43″E
- Grid position: 121/174 L
- Country: Lebanon
- Governorate: South Governorate
- District: Sidon District
- Time zone: UTC+2 (EET)
  - Summer (DST): UTC+3 (EEST)

Aanqoun (Arabic: عنقون, romanized: ʿAnqūn), also called Ankoun, is a municipality in the Sidon District which is one of three districts of the South Governorate in Lebanon. The South Governorate, known also as, Mohafazah of South Lebanon is one of the eight mohafazats (governorates) of Lebanon, containing three major historic and economic cities: Sidon (also known as Saida), Tyre (also known as Soor), and Jezzine.

== Geography ==
Aanqoun is located 14 km away from the city of Sidon which is the capital of the district and the governorate, and 51 km away from Beirut. Anqoun's surface stretches for 9.2 km² (920 hectares - 3.5512 mi²), and its elevations above sea level is around 100 meters (328.1 feet - 109.36 yard).

== Demographics ==
In 2014, Muslims made up 99.22% of registered voters in Aanqoun. 97.97% of the voters were Shiite Muslims.
