= Ali Haidar (politician) =

Syrian politician (born 1962)

State Minister for National Reconciliation Affairs
- In office 23 June 2011 – 26 November 2018

Leader of the Syrian Social Nationalist Party (Intifada)
- Incumbent
- Assumed office 23 June 2011

Personal details
- Born: 1962 (age 63–64) Hama, Syria
- Party: Syrian Social Nationalist Party (Intifada)
- Children: 2
- Education: University of Damascus

Ali Haidar (born 1962) is a Syrian politician who is the leader of the Syrian Social Nationalist Party – Intifada Wing, and from June 2011 to November 2018 was the Minister of State for National Reconciliation Affairs.

== Early life ==
Ali Haidar was born to an Alawite family in Hama-Masyaf in 1962. He studied ophthalmology at the Damascus University, and specialized in surgery and eye diseases. Whilst studying ophthalmology he was classmates with Bashar al-Assad. He graduated from Damascus University in 1994.

== Career ==
In 2012, Haidar led his party into the Popular Front for Change and Liberation coalition of non-Ba'athist parties in the Syrian parliament. Haidar is one of two non-Ba'athist candidates elected to Parliament in May 2012 who were given ministerial posts, the other being Jamil Qadri.

On 12 February 2013, Haidar stated in a press briefing that the Syrian government can hold talks with head of Syrian opposition, Moaz al Khatib. These talks did not transpire. Haidar announced in May 2014 that his party was withdrawing from the Popular Front for Change and Liberation over discrepancy in positions towards the presidential election; his SSNP supported the re-election of Bashar al-Assad.

== Personal life ==
Haidar is married and has two children. His son Ismail was murdered on 2 May 2012 alongside SSNP member Fadi Atawneh on the al-Mahnaya junction on the road between Homs and Masyaf when their car was ambushed by members of the Syrian armed opposition.
