= Our Lady of Saidnaya Monastery =

Christian monastery in Syria

- دير سيدة صيدنايا
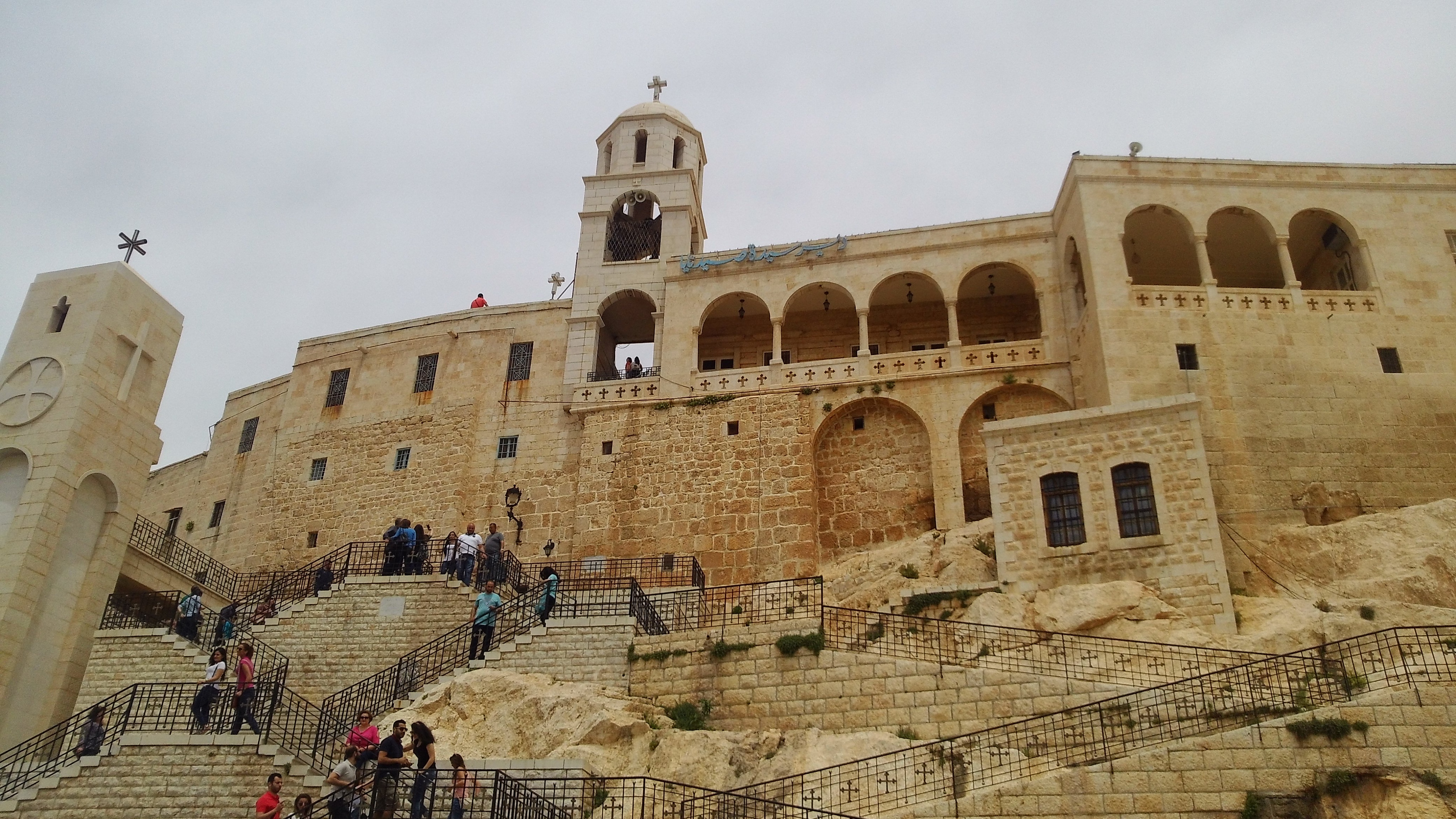
- Interactive map of Our Lady of Saidnaya Monastery

Monastery information
- Full name: Our Lady of Saydnaya Patriarchal Monastery (Arabic: دير سيدة صيدنايا البطريركي)
- Order: Greek Orthodox Church of Antioch
- Established: 547 AD
- Dedicated to: Mary, mother of Jesus

People
- Founder: Justinian I

Site
- Location: Saidnaya, al-Tall District, Rif Dimashq Governorate, Syria
- Coordinates: 33°41′58.5″N 36°22′30.1″E

Our Lady of Saidnaya Patriarchal Monastery (Arabic: دير سيدة صيدنايا البطريركي) is a monastery of the Greek Orthodox Church of Antioch located in Saidnaya, Syria. It is one of the most ancient monasteries in the world and in the region of the Middle East and North Africa, traditionally held to have been founded by Byzantine emperor Justinian I in 547 AD. It is run by a religious order of nuns. It is an important pilgrimage site for Christians, who visit an icon of Saint Mary which is attributed to Saint Luke.

== Description ==
The main chapel has numerous icons and a wooden iconostasis in front of the altar. The pilgrimage shrine, separate from the main chapel, contains the aforementioned icon of Mary, called Shaghoura ("the Illustrious"). The icon is kept hidden behind an ornate, silver-doored niche, while on either side of this shrine are a number of later icons. Numerous beaten silver crosses and other religious symbols, left as ex votos by pilgrims, are displayed on the walls.

== History ==
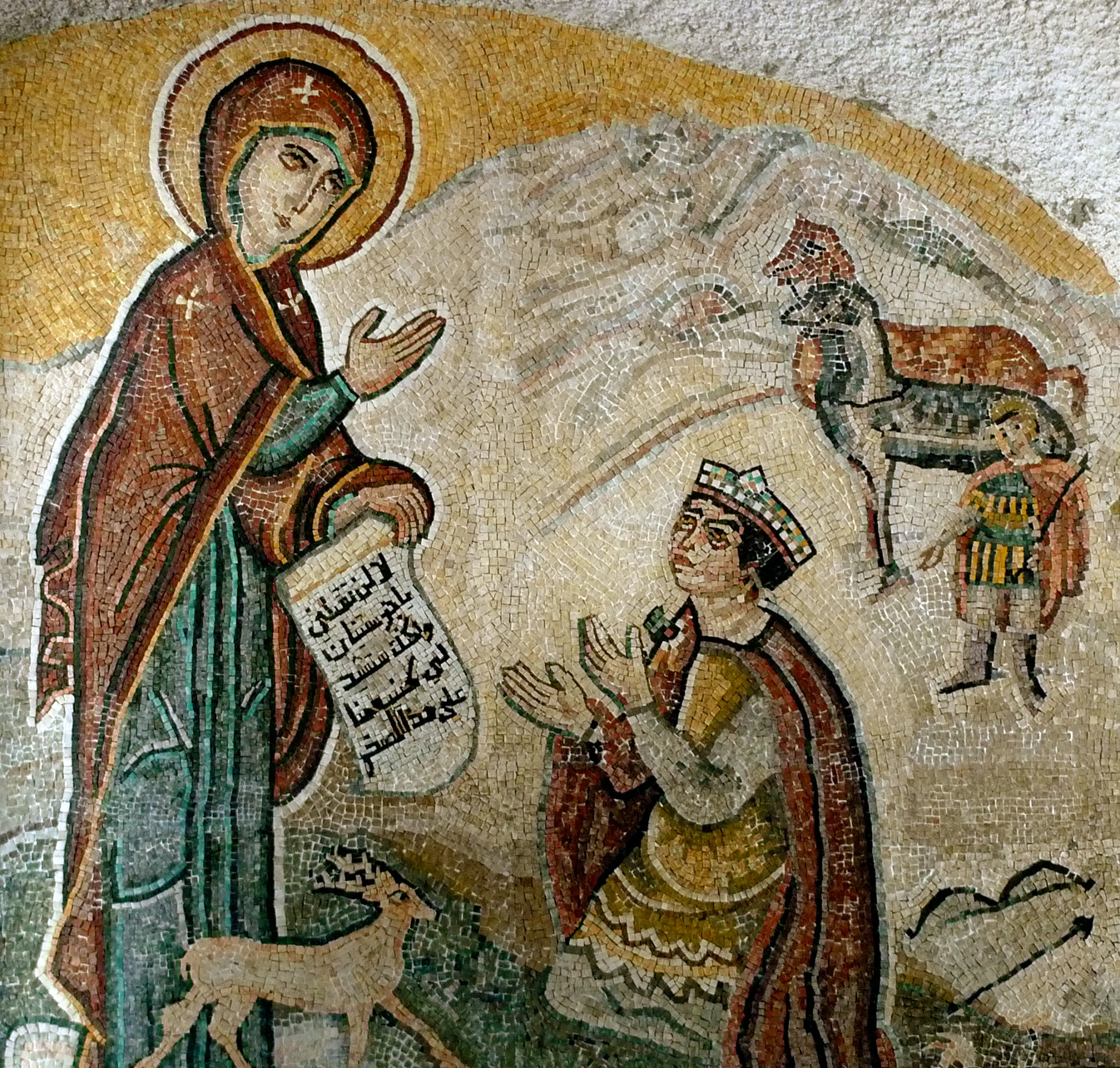
Mosaic depiction of Mary ordering Justinian not to kill her but to build a church on the rock in the background, after having first appeared to him as a gazelle. The scroll she holds reads: لا لن تقتلني يا جوستنيان ولكنك ستشيد لي كنيسة هنا على هذا الصخر ("No, thou shalt not kill me, Justinian, but thou shalt build a church for me, here, on this rock")

Tradition holds that the monastery was built by the Byzantine emperor Justinian I in 547 AD following a vision of the Virgin Mary. During a hunt near Saidnaya, 40 kilometers from Damascus, Justinian is said to have seen a beautiful gazelle and, while pursuing it, ascended a mountain where he encountered the Virgin Mary, who instructed him to build a church there.

According to the same tradition, the Virgin Mary also provided guidance regarding the intended site and design of the church. Justinian dedicated the completed monastery on the Feast of the Nativity of the Virgin Mary, and thereafter, on September 8, Christian pilgrims annually visit the monastery to honour Our Lady of Saidnaya.

Our Lady of Saidnaya was a popular pilgrimage destination throughout the Middle Ages. The site is featured in many Latin pilgrim accounts, including Thietmar's Liber peregrinationis, Burchard von Strassbourg's Itinerarium, and William of Boldensele's Liber de quibusdam ultramarinis partibus et praecipue de Terra sancta. Many Latin accounts of the monastery described the Chaghoura as being "incarnate," or flesh, from the neck down, and leaking holy oil from its breasts. However, this aspect of the icon is absent from the Arabic-language sources that discuss it.

The monastery was partially damaged by an earthquake in 1759, and may have also been damaged by Druze rebels during the anti-Christian riots in 1860. By 1883, the only part of the medieval church that remained was its apse, which has been incorporated into the modern church at Saidnaya. A small room connected to the chapel containing a painting fragment and a now-removed Syriac inscription have also been dated to the twelfth or thirteenth century. The monastery was damaged during the Syrian civil war.

Historian William Dalrymple recounts visitors leaving gifts at the monastery, including space helmets left by Syrian astronauts returning from Mir space station.

== See also ==
- List of heritage sites damaged during Syrian civil war
- Mary in Islam
- Shrines to the Virgin Mary
- Juliette Elmir, held here after the failed 1949 revolution against the Syrian government
