= Adnan al-Malki =

Syrian Army officer

- عدنان المالكي
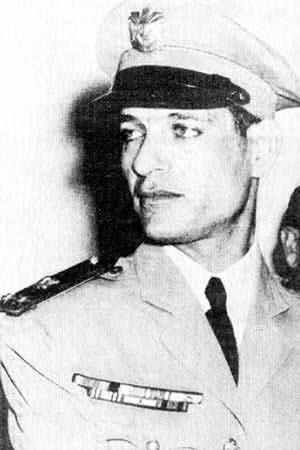

Personal details
- Born: 1918 Damascus, Arab Kingdom of Syria
- Died: 22 April 1955 (aged 37) Damascus, Syrian Republic
- Party: Syrian Regional Branch of the Arab Socialist Ba'ath Party
- Occupation: Deputy Chief of Staff of the Syrian Army

Military service
- Branch/service: Syrian Army
- Years of service: 1935–1955
- Rank: Lieutenant Colonel
- Battles/wars: 1948 Arab-Israeli War

Adnan al-Malki (Arabic: عدنان المالكي) (1918 – 22 April 1955) was a Syrian military officer and prominent political figure in Syria during the 1940s and 1950s. He served as the deputy-chief of staff of the Syrian Army and was one of the most powerful figures in the army and in national politics until his assassination, which was blamed on a Syrian Social Nationalist Party (SSNP) militant in 1955. At the time of his assassination he held the rank of Colonel in the Syrian Army.

Al-Malki's assassination led to a crackdown on the SSNP in Syria.

== Early life ==
Adnan al-Malki was born in 1919 in the al-Shaghour district of Damascus, Syria. He was a member of the Damascene Al-Malki's family, whose origins traced back to the Hejaz region of the Arabian Peninsula.

== Military career ==
Adnan al-Malki graduated from the Homs Military Academy in 1935.

In 1951, President Adib al-Shishakli outlawed most political parties in Syria. Al-Malki, concerned with the president's actions, urged that the Ba'ath Party and the Arab Socialist Party merge. This new consolidated party became known as the Ba'ath Arab Socialist Party in late 1952.

In 1953, al-Malki submitted a memorandum that Colonel Shishakli at the Damascus airport upon his return from Cairo, to release all political prisoners and end the one party rule. This led to his imprisonment in 1954. After al-Shishakli's authoritarian rule over Syria ended, al-Malki was reinstated in the army and promoted to Deputy Chief of Staff.

== Views and Baath Party Affiliation ==
Al-Malki never became a member of the Baath party. He was close to the military leadership of the Baath and his brother Riyad was a long time Baathist. Al-Malki was a Nasserist as well as an Arab nationalist. This collided in particular with the views of the Syrian nationalist SSNP who sought unity with Lebanon, Jordan, Iraq and Palestine instead of Egypt.

== Assassination ==
On Friday 22 April 1955, senior officers including Adnan al-Malki went to the Damascus Municipal Stadium to cheer on the army's football team against a visiting Egyptian team. al-Malki was seated in the VIP box along with General Shuqayr and the Egyptian ambassador. Halfway through the game, military police sergeant Yunis Abdul Rahim fired two shots into al-Malki with his revolver killing him. Abdul Rahim appeared to have personal motivation in the assassination since a few months prior, al-Malki had denied him entry for sectarian reasons into the Homs Military Academy. Abdul Rahim attempted to commit suicide shortly after, however, the gun jammed and he committed suicide with a back-up gun. According to other sources, Abdul Rahim did not act for his own account but killed al-Malki at the personal order of the SSNP's then party leader George Abd al-Massih. Juliette Elmir, another leading figure in the SSNP, was also accused of being involved in the assassination. Her property and belongings were confiscated and she was sentenced to life imprisonment in the Qala’a Dimashq (Citadel of Damascus), serving over ten years before her release. According to Seale, the man behind al-Malki's assassination was actually Anisa Makhluf's first cousin, Badi' Makhluf. For this reason, he was subsequently tried, sentenced to death and hanged.

== Legacy ==
The SSNP was outlawed in Syria. The leadership of the party was arrested or exiled. The aftermath of the assassination also entailed a split within the party. A large statue of Adnan al-Malki was placed in central Damascus and a luxurious neighborhood was named after him by the Ba'ath party that came to power in 1963.

== Bibliography ==
- Commins, David Dean (2004), Historical dictionary of Syria, Scarecrow Press, ISBN 9780810849341
- Saunders, Bonnie F. (1996), The United States and Arab nationalism: the Syrian case, 1953-1960, Greenwood Publishing Group, ISBN 9780275954260
