= List of schisms in Christianity =

In Christianity, a schism occurs when a single religious body divides and becomes two separate religious bodies. The split can be violent or nonviolent but results in at least one of the two newly created bodies considering itself distinct from the other.

In the early Christian church, the formation of a distinction between the concepts of "heresy" and "schism" began. In ecclesiastical usage, the term "heresy" refers to a serious confrontation based on disagreements over fundamental issues of faith or morality, while the term "schism" usually means a lesser form of disunity caused by organizational or less important ideological differences. Heresy is rejection of a doctrine that a Church considered to be essential. Schism is a rejection of communion with the authorities of a Church.

== Definition ==
In Christian theology, the concept of the unity of the Church was developed by the Apostles, Holy Fathers and apologists. The greatest contribution to the doctrine of church unity was made by the apostles Peter and Paul, Ignatius of Antioch, Irenaeus of Lyons, Cyprian of Carthage, Basil the Great, Gregory the Theologian, John Chrysostom, and John of Damascus. Christian ecclesiology insists on the statement that unity and the Church are synonymous, as John Chrysostom wrote: "the name of the Church is not one of separation but of unity and harmony".

Canon 751 of the Latin Church's 1983 Code of Canon Law, promulgated by Pope John Paul II in 1983, defines schism as the following: "schism is the refusal of submission to the Supreme Pontiff or of communion with the members of the Church subject to him". This definition is reused in the Catechism of the Catholic Church.

== List ==

(Not shown are ante-Nicene, nontrinitarian, and restorationist denominations.)

=== Early Christian schisms ===
Christological spectrum within the Great Church after the Council of Nicaea

Since the early days of Christianity, many disputes have arisen between members of the Church.

The following instances of denominations are considered as schisms of Early Christianity by the current mainstream Christian denominations. Many of the earliest schisms originated from the differing views of the Trinity.

==== Classical period ====
| Name of schism | Original location of schism | Start date | Schism resolved | Original Church body | Resulting Church bodies or schismatic bodies | Notes |
|---|---|---|---|---|---|---|
| Marcionian controversy | Rome, Region of Latium and Campania, Italy, Roman Empire (Note: Roma, Regio Latium et Campania, Italia, Imperium Romanum) | c. 144 | c. 10th century | Great Church | Marcionites | According to Tertullian and other writers of early proto-orthodox Christianity, the movement known as Marcionism began with the teachings and excommunication of Marcion of Sinope around 144. Marcion arrived in Rome c. 139–140, soon after the Bar Kokhba revolt, and is said to have contributed 200,000 sestertius to the church, using his personal wealth to fund an ecclesiastical organization. He was influenced by Gnosticism and taught that the teachings of Christ is incompatible with the actions of the God of the Old Testament. By the reign of emperor Commodus (180–192), Marcionism was divided into various opinions with various leaders; among whom was Apelles, whom Rhodo describes as "priding himself on his manner of life and his age, acknowledges one principle, but says that the prophecies are from an opposing principle, being led to this view by the responses of a maiden by name Philumene, who was possessed by a demon". However, "others, among whom were Potitus and Basilicus, held to two principles, as did Marcion himself. Others consider that there are not only two, but three natures. Of these, Syneros was the leader and chief.” In the early 3rd century, a splinter group of Marcionites was established by Prepon the Syrian, who claimed the existence of an intermediate spiritual entity between the good and evil gods. |
| Montanian controversy | Ardabau, Mysia, Province of Asia, Roman Empire (Note: Ardabau, Mysia, Provincia Asia, Imperium Romanum) | c. 157 | c. 9th century | Great Church | Montanists | The schism started after the excommunication of Montanus, along with Prisca and Maximilla, who taught that the Holy Spirit enables new prophecies after Jesus Christ. |
| Quartodeciman controversy | Rome, Region of Latium and Campania, Italy, Roman Empire | c. 190 | early 4th century | Great Church | Quartodecimans | Quartodecimanism (from the Vulgate Latin quarta decima in Leviticus 23:5, meaning fourteenth) is the name given to the practice of commemorating the death of Christ on the day of Passover, the 14th of Nisan according to biblical dating, on whatever day of the week it occurs. The controversy arose from the question of whether to celebrate Easter on Sunday (the first day of the week), or at the time of sacrifice of the Passover lamb. The Quartodecimans claimed that their traditions were inherited from the apostles John and Philip, while the Western Church claimed that theirs have been inherited from the apostles Peter and Paul. Quartodecimanism was popular in Asia Minor, Judea and Syria, however it was rejected by churches in other regions. Montanism brought Quartodeciman practices to the west, for example Blastus was a Roman Montanist who was also a Quartodeciman. It is unclear if the Ebionites were Quartodeciman, however they probably observed Passover in addition to other Jewish festivals. According to Eusebius, in the last decade of the 2nd century a number of synods were convened to deal with the controversy, ruling unanimously that the celebration of Easter should be observed and be exclusively on Sunday. These synods were held in Palestine, Pontus and Osroene in the east, and in Rome and Gaul in the west. It is not known how long the Nisan 14 practice lasted. The church historian Socrates of Constantinople knew of Quartodecimans who were deprived of their churches by John Chrysostom, and harassed in unspecified ways by Nestorius, both bishops of Constantinople. This indicates that the Nisan 14 practice, or a practice that was called by the same name, lingered into the 4th century. Historically, there had been a debate about when quartodecimanism disappeared and in particular whether it disappeared before or after the First Council of Nicaea in 325. According to Mark DelCogliano, "the older opinion persists" but Duchesne's opinion "has gained widespread acceptance." According to DelCogliano, "by the early 4th century all Christians were celebrating Easter on a Sunday. Accordingly, it was not the quartodeciman practice that Constantine sought to eliminate, but rather the so-called 'Protopaschite' practice which calculated the paschal full moon according to the Jewish lunar calendar and not the Julian solar calendar". |
| Sabellian controversy | Rome, Region of Latium and Campania, Italy, Roman Empire | 220 | early 5th century | Great Church | Sabellians; Patripassians | The schism started after Pope Callixtus I excommunicated Sabellius, who taught that the Father, Son and Holy Spirit are different modes or aspects of one God, rather than three distinct persons in God Himself. The controversy ended after the First Council of Nicaea and First Council of Constantinople defined the divine personhood of the Son and the Holy Spirit, respectively. |
| Monarchian controversy | Antioch, Province of Coele Syria, Roman Empire (Note: Antiochia, Provincia Coele Syria, Imperium Romanum) | 269 | – | Great Church | Monarchians; Adoptionists; Modalistic Monarchians | Monarchianism first developed in the 2nd century, but only after Patriarch of Antioch Paul of Samosata was condemned by Synods of Antioch in 269 was it declared as heretical. |
| Donatian controversy | Carthage, Proconsular Province of Africa, Western Roman Empire (Note: Carthago, Provincia Africa Proconsularis, Imperium Romanum Occidentale) | 311 | c. 7th century | Great Church | Donatists | The schism started when a commission appointed by Pope Miltiades condemned the Donatists, who denied the validity of sacraments administered by priests and bishops who had been traditores under the Diocletianic persecution. |
| Arian controversy | Nicaea, Bithynia, Province of Asia, Diocese of Asia, Praetorian prefecture of the East, Eastern Roman Empire (Note: Nicaea, Bithynia, Provincia Asia, Dioecesis Asiana, Praefectura praetorio Orientis, Imperium Romanum Orientale) | July 325 | c. 7th century | Great Church | Arians | It began in 318 as a dispute between Pope Alexander I of Alexandria and a priest in his diocese named Arius, both Christian theologians from Alexandria. |
| Luciferian controversy | Western Roman Empire | 362 | early 5th century | Great Church | Luciferians | Lucifer of Cagliari might have been excommunicated, as is hinted in the writings of Ambrose of Milan and Augustine of Hippo, as well as Jerome, who refers to his followers as Luciferians. |
| Pneumatomachian controversy | Constantinople, Province of Europa, Diocese of Thrace, Praetorian prefecture of the East, Eastern Roman Empire (Note: Constantinopolis, Provincia Europae, Dioecesis Thraciae, Praefectura praetorio Orientis, Imperium Romanum Orientale) | 30 July 381 | early 5th century | Great Church | Pneumatomachi; Semi-Arians | In 381, the First Council of Constantinople was called in an attempt to deal with the binitarians, who were mainly Semi-Arians at that time. However, when the Trinity was officially defined, the offended binitarians (Pneumatomachi and Semi-Arians) walked out. |
| Apollinarian controversy | Constantinople, Province of Europa, Diocese of Thrace, Praetorian prefecture of the East, Eastern Roman Empire | 30 July 381 | late 4th century | Great Church | Apollinarians | Apollinarism or Apollinarianism is a Christological position proposed by Apollinaris, bishop of Laodicea in Syria, that argues that Jesus had not a human body and sensitive soul, but a divine mind and body, the Divine Logos taking the place of the latter. It was deemed heretical by the First Council of Constantinople, and after Theodosius I ratified the conciliar canons, it virtually died out within the following decades. |
| Nestorian schism of 431 | Ephesus, Province of Asia, Diocese of Asia, Praetorian prefecture of the East, Eastern Roman Empire (Note: Ephesus, Provincia Asia, Dioecesis Asiana, Praefectura praetorio Orientis, Imperium Romanum Orientale) | September 431 | – | Great Church | Nestorians | Eastern Roman Emperor Theodosius II convoked the Council of Ephesus, which became two rival councils, each led by patriarchs Cyril I of Alexandria and John I of Antioch, resulting in two sets of canons. The emperor finally ratified the canons of Cyril's party in September 431. |
| Chalcedonian schism | Chalcedon, Province of Bithynia, Diocese of Pontus, Praetorian prefecture of the East, Eastern Roman Empire (Note: Chalcedon, Provincia Bithynia, Dioecesis Pontica, Praefectura praetorio Orientis, Imperium Romanum Orientale) | November 451 | – | Great Church | Great Church (Chalcedonian); Non-Chalcedonian Churches | In the aftermath of the adoption of the Chalcedonian Definition, many hierarchs within the eastern patriarchates who embraced the various non-Chalcedonian understanding such as Monophysitism and Miaphysitism struggled against it. |
| Acacian schism | Eastern Roman Empire | 28 July 484 | 24 March 519 | Great Church (Chalcedonian) | Acacians | Between 498 and c. 505, there had been a Papal schism between Laurentius, who was elected by the Byzantine party, and Symmachus. |
| Nestorian schism of 486 | Veh-Ardashir, Māḥozā, Asoristan, Kušt-i Xwarārān, Sasanian Empire (Note: Vēh-Ardašīr, Māḥozā, Asōristān, Kušt-i Xwarārān, Ērānšahr) | February 486 | 1552 (majority; with the Catholic Church) | Great Church (Chalcedonian) | Church of the East | After the Council of Ephesus, churches aligned with Nestorius, centred on the School of Edessa, were separated from the rest of the Christian Church. Anathemised in the Roman Empire, they relocated to the Sasanian Empire, where they were welcomed by the Persian Christians, who had already declared independence from Constantinople in 424 in an attempt to cast off accusations of foreign allegiance. The Church of the East herself accepted the teaching of the first two ecumenical councils but ignored the 431 Council and those that followed, seeing them as concerning only the patriarchates of the Roman Empire, all of which were for her "Western Christianity." |
| Monothelite controversy | Eastern Roman Empire | 638 | 16 September 681 | Great Church (Chalcedonian) | Monothelites; Monoenergists | The schism began with publication of the Ecthesis in 638, and was solidified by publication of Typos of Constans in 648. It was eventually resolved in the Sixth Ecumenical Council in Constantinople (681). |

==== Medieval period ====
| Name of schism | Original location of schism | Start date | Schism resolved | Original Church body | Resulting Church bodies or Schismatic bodies | Notes |
|---|---|---|---|---|---|---|
| First Byzantine Iconoclasm | Constantinople, Theme of Thrace, Eastern Roman Empire (Note: Kōnstăntīnoúpolĭs, Théma Thrāíkēs, Basileia tôn Rhōmaíōn) | c. 726 | 13 October 787 | Great Church (Chalcedonian) | Iconodules; Iconoclasts; Iconolatrians | The schism was resolved by the Second Council of Nicaea. |
| Second Byzantine Iconoclasm | Constantinople, Theme of Thrace, Eastern Roman Empire | 815 | 4 March 843 | Great Church (Chalcedonian) | Iconodules; Iconoclasts; Iconolatrians | The schism was triggered in 815 by Emperor Leo V's convocation of the Council of Constantinople. It was later overturned one final time by another Council of Constantinople, in 843. |
| Photian schism | Rome, Papal States (Note: Roma, Status Ecclesiasticus) | April 863 | 28 February 870 | Great Church (Chalcedonian) | Church of Rome; Church of Constantinople | Pope Nicholas I refused the judgment of his legates' over the validity of Photios I's election as the ecumenical patriarch of Constantinople, and convened a synod in Rome in April 863, after which the schism ensued. This event foreshadowed the 1054 Schism, and the Western and Eastern wings of the Great Church no longer count the same following councils as ecumenical. |
| East–West Schism | Hagia Sophia, Constantinople, Theme of Thrace, Eastern Roman Empire | 16 July 1054 | – | Great Church (Chalcedonian) | Catholic Church; Eastern Orthodox Church |The first action that led to a formal schism occurred in 1053 when Patriarch Michael I Cerularius of Constantinople ordered the closure of all Latin churches in Constantinople. In 1054, the legates of Pope Leo IX travelled to Constantinople to deny Cerularius the title of "ecumenical patriarch" and insist that he recognize the pope's claim to be the head of all of the churches, and to seek help from the Byzantine emperor, Constantine IX Monomachos, in view of the Norman conquest of southern Italy, and to respond to Leo of Ohrid's attacks on the use of unleavened bread and other Western customs, attacks that had the support of Cerularius. When the leader of the legation, Cardinal Humbert of Silva Candida, learned that Cerularius had refused to accept the demand, he excommunicated him on 16 July, and in response Cerularius excommunicated all the legates in a synod on 20 July. The validity of the Western legates' act is doubtful because Pope Leo IX had died and Ecumenical Patriarch Michael I Cerularius' excommunication only applied to the legates personally. At the time of the excommunications, many contemporary historians, including Byzantine chroniclers, did not consider the event significant. Relations continued as usual. There were pre-modern endeavors to end the schism, such as during the Second Council of Lyon (29 June 1274) and Council of Florence (6 June 1439), but both formally ended in repudiations in Council of Constantinople (1285) and Synod of Constantinople (1484), respectively. On 7 December 1965, Pope Paul VI and Ecumenical Patriarch Athenagoras I nullified the anathemas of 1054. The efforts of successive Ecumenical Patriarchs towards reconciliation with the Catholic Church, insofar, have often been the target of sharp internal criticism. | |

=== Breaks of communion ===
These are schisms involving most of the clergy to defect from a regional basis.

==== Classical period ====
| Name of schism | Original location of schism | Start date | Schism resolved | Original Church body | Resulting Church bodies or schismatic bodies | Notes |
|---|---|---|---|---|---|---|
| Schism of the Three Chapters | Aquileia, Province of Venetia and Histria, Diocese of Italia Annonaria, Praetorian prefecture of Italy, Eastern Roman Empire (Note: Aquileia, Provincia Venetia et Histria, Dioecesis Italia Annonaria, Praefectura praetorio Italiae, Imperium Romanum Orientale) | 553 | 581 (Milan); 606 (Grado); 698 (Aquileia) | Great Church (Chalcedonian) | Patriarchate of Aquileia, dioceses in Liguria, Aemilia, Milan, and the Istrian peninsula | Part of the larger Three-Chapter Controversy. |
| Armenian schism of 555 | Dvin, Armenia, Kušt-i Ādurbādagān, Sasanian Empire (Note: Dvin, Armin, Kust-ī Ādurbādagān, Ērānšahr) | 555 | – | Great Church (Chalcedonian) | Armenian Apostolic Church | Armenian Catholicosate of Dvin withdrew communion with the Chalcedonians but also adopted moderate form of the Aphthartodocetae (Julianism) or Phantasiasm by condemning "books on the corruption" (of the body of Christ), thus also standing outside of the Miaphysite Churches. In 726, during the Council of Manzikert John of Odzun established communion with the Syriac Orthodox Church, condemned Aphthartodocetae, and canonized Severus for the Armenians. |
| Coptic-Syriac schism of 586 | Alexandria, Province of Egypt, Diocese of Egypt, Praetorian prefecture of the East, Eastern Roman Empire (Note: Alexandria, Provincia Aegypti, Dioecesis Aegypti, Praefectura praetorio Orientis, Imperium Romanum Orientale) | 586 | 616 | Miaphysites | Coptic Orthodox Church; Syriac Orthodox Church | It started with Pope Damian of Alexandria's dialogue with Patriarch Peter of Antioch, in which Damian accused his colleague of tritheism and was in turn accused of Sabellianism. Although Damian pulled support for his understanding of the Trinity from the Bible and the teachings of early Church Fathers, he was never able to persuade Peter and, as a result, he ordered that Peter's name not be mentioned in the Divine Liturgy while Peter remained alive. The schism between the Alexandrian and Antiochian churches lasted for almost a decade after Damian's death. |
| Armenian schism of 607 | Dvin, Armenia, Kušt-i Ādurbādagān, Sasanian Empire | 607 | – | Armenian Apostolic Church | Georgian Orthodox Church | During the Third Council of Dvin, the Armenian Church condemned both the Chalcedonian Definition and Monophysitism. This Council mended the internal schism within the Armenian Church and established the formal split between the Armenian and Georgian Churches, who decided to join with Constantinople in upholding the Chalcedonian Definition. |

==== Medieval period ====
| Name of schism | Original location of schism | Start date | Schism resolved | Original Church body | Resulting Church bodies or schismatic bodies | Notes |
|---|---|---|---|---|---|---|
| Maronite schism | Mount Lebanon, Maronite State (Note: Tūr Lêbnān, Mārōnōye) | 685 | c. 1182 (with the Catholic Church) | Great Church | Maronite Church | The Maronites derive their name from Saint Maron, a contemporary and friend of St. John Chrysostom. In 402, he sent Abraham of Cyrrhus, later known as the "Apostle of Lebanon" for evangelizing in the Lebanese mountain. whose followers migrated to the area of Mount Lebanon (present day Republic of Lebanon) from their previous location of residence around the area of Antioch (an ancient Greek city within present day Hatay Province, Turkey), establishing the nucleus of the Maronite Church. In 451 AD, the Maronites followed the Council of Chalcedon, rejecting both monophysitism and miaphysitism in favor of maintaining full communion with the majority of Christian churches in the Roman Empire. This conflict is thought to have resulted, among other things, in a massacre of 350 monks from the monastery of Maron in 517 AD, though the person who gave the order (some accuse the Monophysite Emperor Anastasius I, others the Miaphysite Severus of Antioch and Peter of Apamea) and the event itself have been debated. The Maronites kept their Monothelite doctrine after the Third Council of Constantinople and elected John Maron as their first Patriarch of Antioch for the Maronite Church. The appointing of a Patriarch made the Byzantine Emperor furious, which led to the persecution of the Maronites by the Byzantines. Following the Byzantine persecutions in the Orontes Valley, many Maronite monks left their lands there and took refuge in the mountains of Lebanon. They reunited with the Catholic Church during the Crusades with the mediation by the Latin Patriarch Aimery of Limoges. |
| Bulgarian schism of 1235 | Second Bulgarian Empire | 1235 | – | Catholic Church | Tarnovo Patriarchate | Bulgaria returned to the Eastern Orthodox Church as an autocephalous church. |
| Cathar movement | Saint-Félix-de-Caraman, County of Toulouse, Kingdom of France (Note: Saint-Félix-de-Caraman, Comtat de Tolosa, Royaume des Francs) | 1167 | – | Catholic Church | Cathars | The origins of the Cathars' beliefs are unclear, but most historians of the 20th century concerned with the subject agreed they came from the East, from areas within the deteriorating Byzantine Empire, mostly by the trade routes, and spread from the First Bulgarian Empire to the Netherlands. Catharism was influenced by Gnostic cosmology and Bogomilism. It was a largely local, Western European/Latin Christian phenomenon, springing up in the Rhineland cities, particularly Cologne, in the mid-12th century, northern France around the same time, and particularly the Languedoc—and the northern Italian cities in the mid-late 12th century. In the Languedoc and northern Italy, the Cathars attained their greatest popularity, surviving in the Languedoc, in much reduced form, up to around 1325 and in the Italian cities until the Inquisitions of the 14th century extirpated them. It is now generally agreed by most scholars that identifiable historical Catharism did not emerge until at least 1143, when the first confirmed report of a group espousing similar beliefs is reported being active at Cologne by the cleric Eberwin of Steinfeld. A landmark in the "institutional history" of the Cathars was the Council, held in 1167 at Saint-Félix-Lauragais, attended by many local figures and also by the Bogomil papa Nicetas, the Cathar bishop of (northern) France and a leader of the Cathars of Lombardy. |
| Bulgarian schism of 1185 | Tarnovo, Second Bulgarian Empire | c. 1185 | 1235 | Ecumenical Patriarchate of Constantinople | Archbishopric of Tarnovo | Tsar Kaloyan of Bulgaria knew the Byzantines would never recognize his imperial title; thus he began negotiations with Pope Innocent III. He based the claims on his predecessors in the First Bulgarian Empire; Simeon I, Peter I, and Samuel. The Pope was willing to recognize Kaloyan as king on the condition the Bulgarian Church would submit to Rome. After lengthy negotiations in which both acted diplomatically but without changing their positions, Kaloyan was crowned king in late 1204. Archbishop Basil was proclaimed Primate. Kaloyan had no intention of submitting to that decision; he sent the Pope a letter expressing his gratitude for the Imperial title he had received and the elevation of the Bulgarian Church to a Patriarchate. Eventually the Papacy tacitly accepted the Bulgarian position regarding the Imperial title. The union between Bulgaria and Rome remained strictly official; the Bulgarians did not change their Orthodox rites and traditions. |
| Waldensian movement | Lateran Palace, Rome, Papal States | 30 November 1215 | – | Catholic Church | Waldensians | – |
| Bosnian movement | Banate of Bosnia | 1252 | – | Catholic Church; Eastern Orthodox Church | Bosnian Church | – |
| Serbian schism | Skopje, Kingdom/Empire of Serbia | 16 April 1346 | 1375 | Ecumenical Patriarchate of Constantinople | Serbian Patriarchate of Peć | |
| Strigolnichestvo | Moscow, Principality of Moscow (Note: Moskva, Moskovskoye Knyazhestvo) | c. 1359 | c. 1430 | Eastern Orthodox Church | Strigolniki | One of the major sects of medieval Russia. |
| Bohemian Reformation | Prague, Bohemia, Kingdom of Bohemia, Holy Roman Empire (Note: Praha, Čechy, České království, Sacrum Imperium Romanum) | 18 October 1412 | – | Catholic Church | Hussites | Before Jan Hus left Prague, he decided to take a step which gave a new dimension to his endeavors. He no longer put his trust in an indecisive King, a hostile Pope or an ineffective Council. On 18 October 1412, he appealed to Jesus Christ as the supreme judge. By appealing directly to the highest Christian authority, Christ himself, he bypassed the laws and structures of the medieval Church. For the Bohemian Reformation, this step was as significant as the 95 theses nailed to the door of the Wittenberg church by Martin Luther in 1517. |
| Moscow–Constantinople schism of 1467 | Moscow, Grand Principality of Moscow (Note: Moskva, Velikoye Knyazhestvo Moskovskoye) | c. 1467 | 1560 | Catholic Church; Ecumenical Patriarchate of Constantinople | Russian Orthodox Church | It started de facto in 15 December 1448, when Jonah of Moscow was consecrated as metropolitan of the Russian Church without the consent of the patriarch of Constantinople. It became a de jure schism when Dionysius I of Constantinople demanded that all the Russian hierarchs submit to Gregory the Bulgarian, who was recognized by both Rome and Constantinople as the metropolitan of the newly established metropolis of Kiev, but this was rejected by Ivan III of Russia, who declared a complete rupture of relations with Constantinople. Relations were gradually restored and in 1560, the patriarch of Constantinople considered the metropolitan of Moscow to be his exarch. |
| Heresy of the Judaizers | Moscow, Grand Principality of Moscow | c. 1487 | c. 1504 | Russian Orthodox Church | Judaizers | One of the major sects of medieval Russia. |

==== Early modern period ====
| Name of schism | Original location of schism | Start date | Schism resolved | Original Church body | Resulting Church bodies or schismatic bodies | Notes |
|---|---|---|---|---|---|---|
| Ruthenian Schism of 1596 | St. Nicholas Church, Brest, Brest Litovsk Voivodeship, Grand Duchy of Lithuania, Polish–Lithuanian Commonwealth | 9 October 1596 | – | Eastern Orthodox Church | Ruthenian Uniate Church | |
| Ethiopian schism of 1622 | Ethiopian Empire | March 1622 | 14 June 1632 | Coptic Orthodox Church | Latin Patriarchate of Ethiopia | Emperor Susenyos I converted to Catholicism. The newly appointed patriarch Afonso Mendes, however, rejected the validity of the Ethiopian sacraments and rebaptism and reordination and tried to impose an adopted variant of the Roman Rite. |
| Ethiopian schism of 1632 | Ethiopian Empire | 14 June 1632 | – | Catholic Church | Ethiopian Orthodox Tewahedo Church | Susenyos declared freedom of religion for both Latin Catholics and Oriental Orthodox and then resigned for his son Fasilides, who immediately restored the Tewahedo Church with the consecration abuna by the Coptic pope. |
| Ruthenian Schism of 1646 | Zakarpattia, Kingdom of Hungary | 1646 | – | Eastern Orthodox Church | Ruthenian Greek Catholic Church | Union of Uzhhorod was signed by 63 Ruthenian presbyters led by Vasyl Tarasovych and Petro Parfenii, forming Greek Catholic Eparchy of Mukachevo out from jurisdiction of Ecumenical Patriarchate of Constantinople into communion with Papacy as Uniate. |
| Coonan Cross Oath | Mattancherry, Kingdom of Cochin | 3 January 1653 | 31 January 1663 (majority) | Catholic Church | Malabar Church | With the Oath, the Saint Thomas Christians renounced the full communion with Rome leading to a schism. The majority returned in 1663 under Palliveettil Chandy. Some factions of the Puthankoottukar also reunited with Rome later on. |
| Romanian Schism of 1698 | Gyulafehérvár, Principality of Transylvania, Kingdom of Hungary, Habsburg monarchy | 7 October 1698 | – | Eastern Orthodox Church | Romanian Greek Catholic Church | The church was forcefully fused into Romanian Orthodox Church in 1948 and was legalized again in 1989. |

==== 18th and 19th centuries ====
| Name of schism | Original location of schism | Start date | Schism resolved | Original Church body | Resulting Church bodies or schismatic bodies | Notes |
|---|---|---|---|---|---|---|
| French schism | Kingdom of France | 12 July 1790 | 15 July 1801 | Catholic Church | Constitutional Church | |
| Greek schism | Kingdom of Greece | 25 July 1833 | 29 June 1850 | Ecumenical Patriarchate of Constantinople | Church of Greece | |
| Padroado-Propaganda Schism | India, Southeast Asia | 24 April 1838 | 1 September 1886 | Catholic Church | Roman Catholic Archdiocese of Goa and Daman | It came to the schism, when dissolved the sees of Cochin, Cranganore, Malacca and Mylapore and was fully healed with the creation of Patriarchate of the East Indies. |
| Romanian schism | United Principalities of Moldavia and Wallachia | 3 December 1864 | 25 April 1884 | Ecumenical Patriarchate of Constantinople | Romanian Orthodox Church | |
| Bulgarian schism | Constantinople, Constantinople Sanjak, Rumelia Eyalet, Ottoman Empire (Note: Ḳosṭanṭīnīye, Sancak-i Ḳosṭanṭīnīye, Eyālet-i Rūm-ėli, Devlet-i ʿAlīye-i ʿOs̱mānīye) | 30 September 1872 | 22 February 1945 | Ecumenical Patriarchate of Constantinople | Bulgarian Exarchate | On 23 May 1872, Anthim I declared the autocephaly of the Bulgarian Exarchate. The patriarchs of Constantinople, Alexandria, and Antioch later declared the exarchate schismatic and declared its adherents excommunicated. The schism was later lifted in 1945. |

==== 20th centuries ====
| Name of schism | Original location of schism | Start date | Schism resolved | Original Church body | Resulting Church bodies or schismatic bodies | Notes |
|---|---|---|---|---|---|---|
| Georgian schism of 1917 | Special Transcaucasian Committee, Russian Provisional Government | 25 March 1917 N.S. | 31 October 1943 | Russian Orthodox Church | Georgian Orthodox Church | |
| UAOC schism of 1919 | Ukrainian People's Republic | 1 January 1919 | 27 November 1937 | Russian Orthodox Church | Ukrainian Autocephalous Orthodox Church (1919–1937) | Most of the clergy fell victim to the Great Purge. |
| Turkish schism of 1922 | Kayseri, Government of the Grand National Assembly | 15 September 1922 | – | Ecumenical Patriarchate of Constantinople | Autocephalous Turkish Orthodox Patriarchate | Most of the Karamanlides remained loyal towards and were not exempted from the population exchange with Greece. |
| AOCC schism of 1927 | Commonwealth of Massachusetts, United States of America | 2 February 1927 | c. 1933 (majority) | Russian Orthodox Church | American Orthodox Catholic Church | Some continuing churches exist as of 2026. |
| BAOC schism of 1927 | Minsk, Byelorussian Soviet Socialist Republic, Union of Soviet Socialist Republics (Note: Miensk, Bielaruskaja Sacyjalistyčnaja Savieckaja Respublika, Soyuz Sovetskikh Sotsialisticheskikh Respublik) | 9 August 1927 | c. 1939 | Russian Orthodox Church | Belarusian Autocephalous Orthodox Church | Most of the clergy fell victim to the Great Purge. |
| Russian schism of 1927 | Palace of the Patriarchate, Sremski Karlovci, Južnobački okrug, Srem Oblast, Kingdom of Serbs, Croats, and Slovenes | 5 September 1927 | 17 May 2007 | Russian Orthodox Church | Russian Orthodox Church Outside of Russia | |
| UAOC schism of 1942 | Pinsk, Wolhynien und Podolien, Reichskommissariat Ukraine, German Reich | 8 February 1942 | 12 March 1995 | Russian Orthodox Church | Ukrainian Autocephalous Orthodox Church (1942—1944) | Mostly exists in exile since 1944. Despite its current name, Ukrainian Autocephalous Orthodox Church in Diaspora, became an autonomous branch of the Ecumenical Patriarchate of Constantinople in 1995. |
| Croatian schism of 1942 | Independent State of Croatia | 4 April 1942 | 8 May 1945 | Serbian Orthodox Church | Croatian Orthodox Church | |
| BAOC schism of 1942 | Minsk, Generalbezirk Weißruthenien, Reichskommissariat Ostland, German Reich (Note: Minsk, Generalbezirk Weißruthenien, Reichskommissariat Ostland, Deutsches Reich) | 30 August 1942 | – | Russian Orthodox Church | Belarusian Autocephalous Orthodox Church | Mostly exists in exile since 1944. |
| CPCA movement | City of Běijīng, Běijīng Municipality, People's Republic of China (Note: Běijīng Shì, Běijīng Zhíxiáshì, Zhōnghuá Rénmín Gònghéguó) | 15 July 1957 | – | Catholic Church | Chinese Catholic Patriotic Association | |
| Macedonian schism of 1967 | Ohrid, Socialist Republic of Macedonia, Socialist Federal Republic of Yugoslavia | 19 July 1967 | 16 May 2022 | Serbian Orthodox Church | Macedonian Orthodox Church | The church reunited for a interim period and was officially granted autocephaly on 5 June 2022. |
| Ethiopian–Coptic schism of 1976 | Palace of Prince Asrate Kassa, Addis Ababa, Provisional Military Government of Socialist Ethiopia | 14 July 1976 | 1992 | Coptic Orthodox Church | Ethiopian Orthodox Tewahedo Church | The Coptic church refused to recognise the Ethiopian patriarchs following the execution of Abuna Theophilos until the enthronement of Abune Merkorios. |
| UAOC schism of 1989 | Ukraine | 22 October 1989 | 15 December 2018 | Russian Orthodox Church | Ukrainian Autocephalous Orthodox Church | Their merger into the Orthodox Church of Ukraine caused the Moscow–Constantinople schism of 2018. |
| UOC-KP schism of 1992 | Ukraine | 11 June 1992 | 15 December 2018 | Russian Orthodox Church | Ukrainian Orthodox Church – Kyiv Patriarchate | Their merger into the Orthodox Church of Ukraine caused the Moscow–Constantinople schism of 2018. |
| MOC schism of 1993 | Cetinje, Republic of Montenegro, Federal Republic of Yugoslavia | 31 October 1993 | – | Serbian Orthodox Church | Montenegrin Orthodox Church | |
| Moscow–Constantinople schism of 1996 | Danilov Monastery, Danilovsky District, Southern Administrative Okrug, Federal City of Moscow, Russian Federation (Note: Danílovskiy rayon, Yuzhny administrativny okrug, Gorod federal'nogo znacheniya Moskva, Rossiyskaya Federatsiya) | 23 February 1996 | 16 May 1996 | Eastern Orthodox Church | Ecumenical Patriarchate of Constantinople; Russian Orthodox Church | It began on 23 February 1996 when the Russian Orthodox Church severed full communion with the Ecumenical Patriarchate of Constantinople, and ended on 16 May 1996 when the Russian Orthodox Church and the Ecumenical Patriarchate reached an agreement. |

==== 21st centuries ====
| Name of schism | Original location of schism | Start date | Schism resolved | Original Church body | Resulting Church bodies or schismatic bodies | Notes |
|---|---|---|---|---|---|---|
| PNCC schism of 2003 | | 2003 | – | Union of Utrecht (Old Catholic) | Polish National Catholic Church | |
| Abkhazian schism | Abkhazia, Georgia | 15 September 2009 | – | Georgian Orthodox Church | Abkhazian Orthodox Church | Effectively in schism since the War in Abkhazia but only declared de jure autocephaly in 2009. |
| Presbyterian schism of 2018 | Belfast, Northern Ireland, United Kingdom | 9 June 2018 | – | Church of Scotland | Presbyterian Church in Ireland | The Presbyterian Church in Ireland voted to loosen its ties to the Church of Scotland over same-sex marriage. |
| Moscow–Constantinople schism of 2018 | Capital City of Minsk, Republic of Belarus (Note: Stalíca Miensk, Respublika Biełaruś) | 15 October 2018 | – | Eastern Orthodox Church | Ecumenical Patriarchate of Constantinople; Russian Orthodox Church | Includes other schisms in Estonia, Latvia, Lithuania, and Ukraine. |
| Tigrayan schism | Tigray Region, Ethiopia | 7 May 2021 | – | Ethiopian Orthodox Tewahedo Church | Tigrayan Orthodox Tewahedo Church | |
| Abune Mathias–Abune Sawiros schism | Oromia Region, Addis Ababa, Ethiopia | 22 January 2023 | 16 February 2023 | Ethiopian Orthodox Tewahedo Church | Orthodox Tewahedo Church of Oromia and Nations and Nationalities | |
| Anglican schism of 2025 | Kigali, Republic of Rwanda | 16 October 2025 | – | Anglican Communion | Global Fellowship of Confessing Anglicans | Part of Anglican realignment. |

=== Disputed leadership elections ===
==== Classical period ====
| Name of schism | Original location of schism | Start date | Schism resolved | Original Church body | Resulting Church bodies or Schismatic bodies | Notes |
|---|---|---|---|---|---|---|
| Hippolytian(?) schism | Roma, Italia, Roman Empire | 20 December 217 | 28 September 235 | Diocese of Rome | | |
| Novatian schism | Roma, Italia, Roman Empire | 251 | 8th century | Diocese of Rome | Novatianists | The schism started after Novatian was consecrated bishop by three bishops of Italy and declared himself to be the true Pope in opposition to Pope Cornelius. He held that lapsed Christians, who had not maintained their confession of faith under persecution, may not be received again into communion with the church. |
| Meletian schism | Antiochia, Provincia Syria, Dioecesis Orientis, Praefectura praetorio Orientis, Roman Empire | 361 | 415 | Patriarchate of Antioch | Meletians; Eustathians | The schism originated when Patriarch Meletius of Antioch was opposed by those faithful to the memory of Patriarch Eustathius of Antioch due to the unclarity of his theological position. |

==== Medieval period ====
| Name of schism | Original location of schism | Start date | Schism resolved | Original Church body | Resulting Church bodies or Schismatic bodies | Notes |
|---|---|---|---|---|---|---|
| Grado–Aquileia schism | Aquileia, Duchy of Friuli, Kingdom of the Lombards | 606 | 6 July 1751 | Patriarchate of Aquileia | Candidianus line (Grado); John I line (Aquileia) | The Schism of the Three Chapters ended in 698 and both patriarchates ended up under the Roman Church. The Council of Mantua failed to conciliate the factions. The Patriarchate of Grado was suppressed in 1451 and was followed by the still existing Patriarchate of Venice while Aquileia was suppressed in 1751. |
| Wibertine schism | Brixen, Prince-Bishopric of Brixen, Holy Roman Empire | 15 June 1080 | 22 April 1121 | Catholic Church | Gregory VII line Clement III line | During the Investiture Controversy, Emperor Henry IV organised a synod to declare Pope Gregory VII deposed in 1080 and appointed Antipope Clement III in 1084. His son Henry V continued to appoint antipopes until 1121. The controversy was resolved between 1122 and 1123. |
| Double papal election of 1130 | Church of San Marco, Rome, Papal States | 14 February 1130 | 29 May 1138 | Catholic Church | Innocent II line Anacletus II line | Anacletus II died in 25 January 1138 and was succeeded by Victor IV until his submission to Innocent II on 29 May 1138. |
| Double papal election of 1159 | Old St. Peter's Basilica, Rome, Papal States | 7 September 1159 | January 1180 | Catholic Church | Alexander III line Victor IV line | Victor IV died in 20 April 1164 and was succeeded by Paschal III, and then Callixtus III until the latter's submission to Alexander III on 29 August 1178. On 29 September 1179, Innocent III was elected, who eventually was captured by forces loyal to Alexander III and spent his remaining days in the abbey of La Trinità della Cava. |
| Epirote schism | Arta, Empire of Thessalonica | c. 1227 | c. 1233 | Ecumenical Patriarchate of Constantinople | Archbishopric of Ohrid | It is related to the Struggle for Constantinople (1204–1261). Demetrius of Ohrid did not recognise the Ecumenical Patriarch in the Empire of Nicaea and saw the creation of the Eparchy of Žiča as illegitimate. The conflict escalated when crowned Theodore of Epirus emperor in c. 1225. The schism officially started when the Nicene patriarch rejected the demands of the Council of Arta in 1227. Under Theodore's son Manuel Doukas, a synod resolved the schism. |
| Arsenite Schism | Constantinople, Theme of Thrace, Eastern Roman Empire | 28 December 1266 | 1315 | Ecumenical Patriarchate of Constantinople | Arsenius I's supporters Joseph I's supporters | After Michael VIII Palaiologos captured Constantinople, he blinded his young co-emperor John IV Doukas Laskaris, for which Patriarch Arsenius excommunicated him, even refusing to lift it after his deposition from the patriarchate. On 28 December 1266, Joseph I was elected patriarch and promptly absolved the emperor, and their supporters went into dispute over it. This situation lasted until 1315, when a reconciliation was pronounced by the patriarch Nephon I of Constantinople. |
| Syriac Orthodox schism of 1292 | Gawikat, Armenian Kingdom of Cilicia | November 1292 | 1445 | Syriac Orthodox Church | Michael II line (Gawikat); Ignatius Constantine line (Malīṭīná) | Following the death of the patriarch Philoxenus I Nemrud in July 1292, Ignatius Constantine was consecrated on November 1292 in Melitene. On the same month, Michael II was also consecrated in Gawikat. In 1293, the two claimants to the Syriac patriarchate of Antioch were joined by Ignatius bar Wahib in Mardin. In c. 1360 the patriarchate in Melitene lapsed, and then in 1444–1445, Ignatius Behnam Hadloyo of the Mardin line was also recognized as the legitimate patriarch by hierarchs of the Gawikat line. |
| Papal schism of 1328 | Old St. Peter's Basilica, Rome, Papal States | 12 May 1328 | 25 July 1330 | Catholic Church | John XXII line Nicholas V line | Nicholas V was appointed by Louis IV becoming the first antipope installed by an emperor against a well established pope in almost two centuries. |
| Syriac Orthodox schism of 1364 | Monastery of Saint Jacob, Salaḥ, Ṭūr ʿAḇdīn, Emirate of Hasankeyf | 1364 | 1840 | Syriac Orthodox Church | Ignatius Ismail line (Mardīn); Ignatius Saba I line (Salaḥ) | This schism established the lineage of Syriac Orthodox Patriarchs of Tur Abdin until 1839–1840. |
| Western Schism | Fondi, Contea di Fondi, Kingdom of Naples | 20 September 1378 | 11 November 1417 | Catholic Church | Urban VI line Clement VII line | Pope Gregory XI, the last Avignon pope, decided to return to Rome on 17 January 1377, then he died in the Vatican palace on 27 March 1378. The Romans put into operation a plan to use intimidation and violence (impressio et metus) to ensure the election of a Roman pope after 70 years in Avignon. On 8 April 1378, the cardinals elected Bartolomeo Prignano, as Pope Urban VI. The majority of the cardinal-electors quickly regretted their decision and removed themselves to Anagni. Meeting at Fondi, thirteen cardinals elected Count Robert of Geneva as Pope Clement VII on 20 September 1378. The dissident cardinals argued that the election of Urban VI was invalid because it had been out of fear of the rioting Roman crowds. Later the two papal lines were joined by a third, when on 5 June 1409, the Council of Pisa attempted to depose both the Roman and Avignon pontifical claimants, but proceeded to inflame the problem even further by electing Petros Philargos as Alexander V. It was eventually resolved in the Council of Constance and the election of Oddone Colonna as Pope Martin V. However, two Avignonian cardinals acted as Antipope Benedict XIV known as the "hidden pope" up to c. 1437. |
| Papal schism of 1439 | Basel, Fürstbistum Basel, Holy Roman Empire | 5 November 1439 | 7 April 1449 | Catholic Church | Eugene IV line Felix V line | – |
| Georgian schism | Kingdom of Imereti | c. 1470 | c. 1545 | Georgian Orthodox Church | Catholicate of Abkhazia | The communion was restored in a joint synod in 1540s. The Abkhazian church outlived the original church by three years and was dissolved in 1814. |

==== Early modern period ====
| Name of schism | Original location of schism | Start date | Schism resolved | Original Church body | Resulting Church bodies or Schismatic bodies | Notes |
|---|---|---|---|---|---|---|
| Assyrian schism of 1552 | Musul, Sancak-i Musul, Eyālet-i Baġdād, Ottoman Empire | 1552 | – | Church of the East | Shemon VII Ishoyahb line Shimun VIII Yohannan Sulaqa line | |
| Syriac Orthodox schism of 1662 | Ḥaleb, Sancak-i Ḥaleb, Eyālet-i Ḥaleb, Ottoman Empire | 1662 | – | Syriac Patriarchate of Antioch | Ignatius Andrew Akijan line Ignatius Abdulmasih I line | |
| Assyrian schism of 1669 | Amid, Sancak-i Hamid, Eyālet-i Diyār-i Bekr, Ottoman Empire | c. 1670 | – | Church of the East | Joseph I line | He was consecrated as bishop of Amid and converted to Eastern Catholicism leading to his defrocking by Eliya IX of the Shemon line. He was recognised as patriarch in c. 1677 by Ottoman authorities before getting Papal backing to become head of the Chaldean Catholic Church replacing the Shimun line. |
| Melkite schism of 1673 | Constantinople, Constantinople Sanjak, Rumelia Eyalet, Ottoman Empire | 1673 | 1682 | Melkite Patriarchate of Antioch | Cyril V Zaim line Neophytos of Chios line | |
| Melkite schism of 1685 | Constantinople, Constantinople Sanjak, Rumelia Eyalet, Ottoman Empire | 5 July 1685 | October 1694 | Melkite Patriarchate of Antioch | Cyril V Zaim line Athanasius III Dabbas line | |
| Melkite schism of 1724 | Constantinople, Constantinople Sanjak, Rumelia Eyalet, Ottoman Empire | 8 October 1724 | – | Melkite Patriarchate of Antioch | Melkite Catholic Patriarchate of Antioch; Greek Orthodox Patriarchate of Antioch | On 24 September 1724, Cyril VI Tanas was elected patriarch of Antioch and sought communion with Rome. Patriarch Jeremias III of Constantinople declared the election invalid and appointed Sylvester of Antioch, whom he consecrated on 8 October, forming parallel successions. The papacy moved with great caution, and only recognized Cyril VI in 1730. |
| Ultrajectine schism of 1724 | Amsterdam, Graafschap Holland, Dutch Republic | 15 October 1724 | – | Catholic Church (Archdiocese of Utrecht) | Jansenist Church of Holland | Dominique Marie Varlet consecrated Cornelius van Steenoven as archbishop of Utrecht on 15 October 1724 without papal mandate. Pope Benedict XIII formally declared the consecration "illicit and execrable" and censured Varlet on 21 February 1725. After the restoration of Roman Catholic hierarchy in 1853, the Ultrajectine church renamed itself Old Catholic. |
| Armenian schism of 1740 | Ottoman Empire | 26 November 1740 | – | Holy See of Cilicia | Michael I line Abraham Petros I Ardzivian line | Michael was elected in 1737. His opponents elected Abraham Ardzivian in 1740 who sought an union with Rome forming the Armenian Catholic Church. |
| Assyrian schism of 1780 | Musul, Sancak-i Musul, Eyālet-i Baġdād, Ottoman Empire | c. 1780 | 1804 | Church of the East | Eliya XII line Yohannan VIII Hormizd line | Yohannan outlived his cousin Eliya thus reuniting the Shemon VII Ishoyahb factions. In 1827, he outlived Joseph V and became the head of the Chaldean Catholic Church replacing the Joseph I line. |

==== Late modern period ====
| Name of schism | Original location of schism | Start date | Schism resolved | Original Church body | Resulting Church bodies or Schismatic bodies | Notes |
|---|---|---|---|---|---|---|
| Mormon succession crisis | Carthage, Hancock County, Illinois, United States of America | 27 June 1844 | – | Church of Christ (Latter Day Saints) | LDS church Bickertonite church Strangite church Church of Christ (Temple Lot); Church of Christ With the Elijah Message; Cutlerite church Community of Christ | |
| Watch Tower Society presidency dispute | Pittsburgh, Allegheny County, Commonwealth of Pennsylvania, United States of America | 8 August 1917 | – | Watch Tower Society | Joseph Franklin Rutherford's faction former Watch Tower Society directors | |
| Ethiopian Schism of 1991 | Transitional Government of Ethiopia | 1991 | 28 July 2018 | Ethiopian Orthodox Tewahedo Church | Ethiopian Orthodox Church in Exile | |
| Bulgarian Schism of 1996 | Republic of Bulgaria | 4 July 1996 | 20 May 2015 | Bulgarian Orthodox Church | Bulgarian Orthodox Church – Alternative synod | |

=== Foundations of Protestant denominations ===
==== 16th century schisms ====
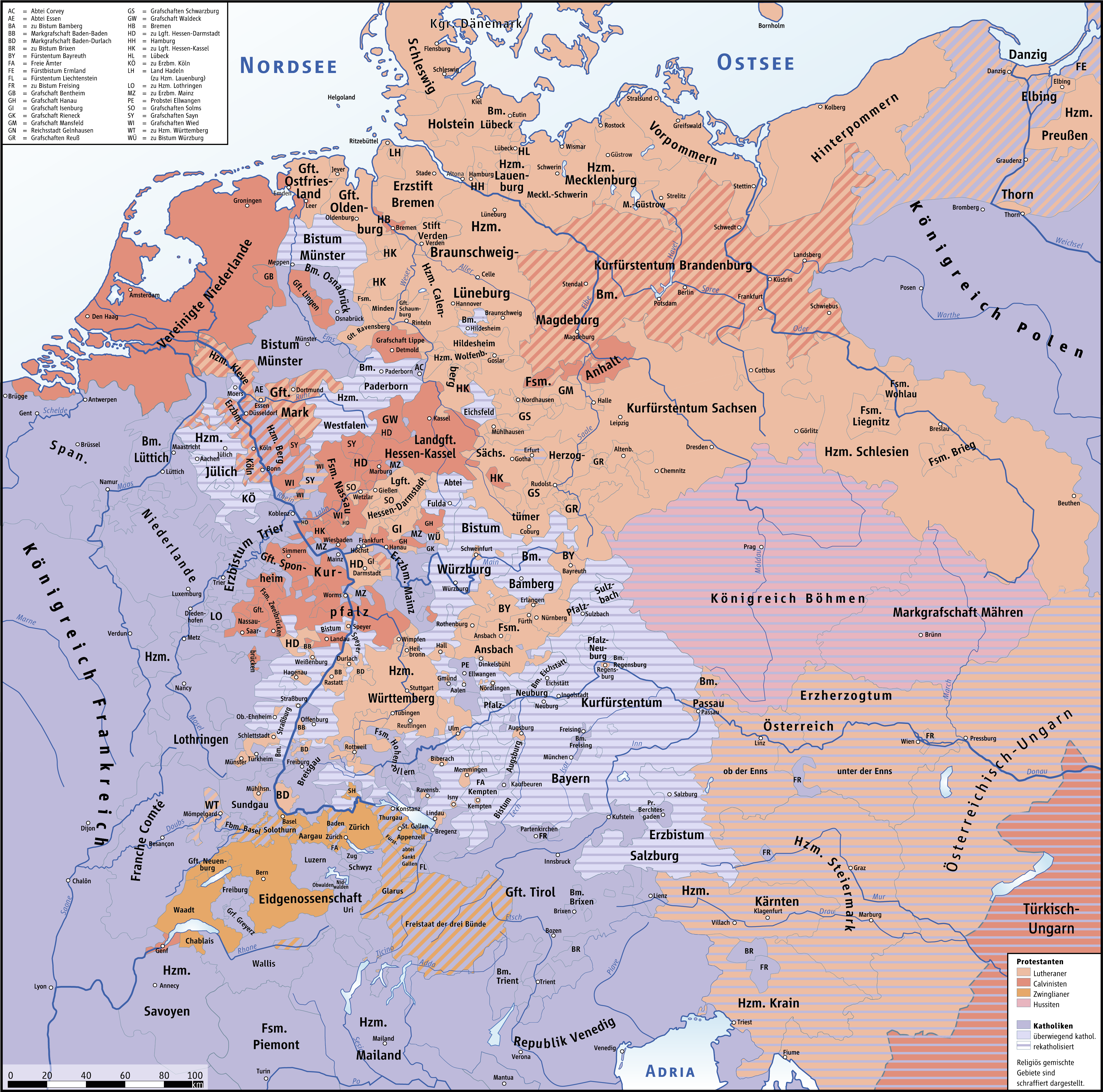
Protestant regions within the Holy Roman Empire (including Switzerland and Bohemia)

These include Reformations in those regions where the original clergy was largely replaced.

| Name of schism | Original location of schism | Start date | Schism resolved | Original Church body | Resulting Church bodies or Schismatic bodies | Notes |
|---|---|---|---|---|---|---|
| Protestant Reformation | Worms, Freie und Reichsstädte Worms, Oberrheinischer Reichskreis, Holy Roman Empire | 25 May 1521 | – | Catholic Church | Lutherans | Although the Reformation is usually considered to have begun in 1517, this edict is the first overt schism associated with it. |
| Reformation in Zürich | Zürich, Republik Zürich, Corpus helveticum, Holy Roman Empire | 1523 | – | Catholic Church | Zwinglians | Initially sparked during the Affair of the Sausages by Huldrych Zwingli in 1522, his ideas gained the support of the magistrates of the city of Zürich and Katharina von Zimmern, the princess-abbes of Fraumünster. One of the earliest episodes of the Reformation in Switzerland. |
| Radical Reformation | Zürich, Republik Zürich, Corpus helveticum, Holy Roman Empire | 1525 | – | Zwinglians | Anabaptists | Anabaptism in Switzerland began as an offshoot of the church reforms instigated by Huldrych Zwingli. |
| Reformation in Sweden | Västerås, Västmanlandskap, Svealand, Kingdom of Sweden | 22 June 1527 | – | Catholic Church | Church of Sweden | It resulted in both Sweden and Finland becoming Protestant countries, as the latter formed an integral part of Sweden at the time. Most of the clergy remained in place. |
| English Reformation | Palace of Westminster, Westminster, Middlesex, Kingdom of England | 3 November 1534 | – | Catholic Church | Church of England | Originally started as an attempt by King Henry VIII of England to circumvent his inability to obtain a papal-sanctioned annulment from his marriage to Catherine of Aragon. In 1531, Henry created the title Supreme Head of the Church of England for himself, which was put into law by the 1534 Act of Supremacy. The parliament of Ireland followed suit in 1537, but most of the Irish population remained Catholic. The schism was formally ended when Mary I reunited the English Church with the Roman Catholic Church, but it was reignited by Pope Pius V's excommunication of Elizabeth I through the bull Regnans in Excelsis, issued on 25 February 1570. Most of the clergy remained in place. |
| Reformation in Geneva | Genève, République de Genève, Holy Roman Empire | 21 May 1536 | – | Catholic Church | Calvinists | Part of the Reformation in Switzerland. |
| Reformation in Denmark–Norway | København, Sokkelund Herred, København Amt, Sjælland, Denmark–Norway | 2 September 1537 | – | Catholic Church | Church of Denmark; Church of Norway | On 2 September 1537, Christian III of Denmark signed a new Church order for the kingdoms of Denmark and Norway and all his other possessions. |
| Reformation in Hungary | Erdőd, Szatmár vármegye, Eastern Hungarian Kingdom | 20 September 1545 | – | Catholic Church | Hungarian Protestants | In 1545, the First Synod of Erdőd, then in Eastern Hungary, adopted the Lutheran Augsburg Confession. Then, on August 1549, the Pentapolitana of Upper Hungary (now mostly in Slovakia) adopted the Confessio Pentapolitana written by Leonard Stöckel, which was recognised by Ferdinand I in Royal Hungary. Part of Reformation in the Kingdom of Hungary. |
| Reformation in France | Paris, Kingdom of France | 27 May 1559 | – | Catholic Church | Reformed Church of France | |
| Scottish Reformation | Parliament House, Edinburgh, Edinburghshire, Kingdom of Scotland | August 1560 | – | Catholic Church | Church of Scotland | Most of the clergy remained in place. |
| Unitarian schism in Poland | Brzeziny, Łęczyca Voivodeship, Greater Poland Province, Crown of the Kingdom of Poland, Polish–Lithuanian Union | 10 June 1565 | 20 July 1658 | Reformed Church of Poland | Polish Brethren | The Polish Brethren were expelled during the Deluge. |
| Brownist schism | London, City of London, Kingdom of England | March 1566 | – | Church of England | London underground church | The forerunners of the Pilgrims and modern Congregationalism. |
| Lutheran–Calvinist split in Hungary | Debrecen, Bihar vármegye, Eastern Hungarian Kingdom | 26 February 1567 | – | Hungarian Protestants | Evangelical-Lutheran Church in Hungary; Reformed Church in Hungary | Hungarian Calvinists held their first synod in Debrecen and adopted the Helvetic Confession on 24–26 February 1567. Part of Reformation in the Kingdom of Hungary. |
| Calvinist–Unitarian schism in Hungary | Torda, Torda vármegye, Eastern Hungarian Kingdom | 28 January 1568 | – | Reformed Church in Hungary | Unitarian Church of Transylvania | The Unitarian Church was first recognized by the Edict of Torda, issued by the Transylvanian Diet under its Unitarian Prince John II Sigismund Zápolya (January 1568), and was first led by Ferenc Dávid (a former Calvinist bishop, who had begun preaching the new doctrine in 1566). Early on, the Unitarian Church had notable successes: it included 425 parishes, made use of the monumental St. Michael's Church in Cluj-Napoca, and attracted members of the eastern Transylvanian Székely community in large numbers. Part of Reformation in the Kingdom of Hungary. |

==== 17th century schisms ====
| Name of schism | Original location of schism | Start date | Schism resolved | Original Church body | Resulting Church bodies or schismatic bodies | Notes |
|---|---|---|---|---|---|---|
| Baptist movement | Amsterdam, Graafschap Holland, Dutch Republic | 1609 | – | Church of England | Baptists | The movement later came to be called General Baptists, as they held Arminian soteriology, in contrast to the Reformed Baptists who held Calvinistic soteriology. |
| Reformed Baptist movement | Kingdom of England | c. 1630 | – | Church of England | Reformed Baptists | |
| Arminian expulsion | Dordrecht, Graafschap Holland, Dutch Republic | 1619 | – | Dutch Reformed Church | Remonstrants | |
| Sabbatarian expulsion | Dés, Principality of Transylvania | 7 July 1638 | c. 1944 | Unitarian Church of Transylvania | Szekler Sabbatarians | The Sabbatarians were expelled from the church and remained their own group until they were murdered during the Holocaust. |
| Great Ejection | Palace of Westminster, Westminster, Middlesex, Kingdom of England | 19 May 1662 | – | Church of England | Puritans | Ejection followed the 1662 Act of Uniformity in England. Several thousand Puritan ministers were forced out of their positions in the Church of England following the Restoration of Charles II. It was a consequence (not necessarily an intended one) of the Savoy Conference of 1661. |
| Nonjuring schism of 1688 | Palace of Westminster, Westminster, Middlesex, Kingdom of England | 24 April 1688 | c. 1779 | Church of England | Non-Jurors | After Glorious Revolution, clergy had to swear an oath of allegiance to the new monarchs. The consecutively deaths of all their original bishops, James II, William III and George Hickes caused many to return to the Church of England in 1710s. The remaining group began to split into "Usagers" and "Non-Usagers" over liturgical questions. The last non-juring bishop in regular succession died in 1779. Another line ended in 1805 with some alleged minor groups continuing into the 19th century. |
| Nonjuring schism of 1690 | Parliament House, Edinburgh, Edinburghshire, Kingdom of Scotland | 7 June 1690 | – | Church of Scotland | (Presbyterian) Church of Scotland; Scottish Episcopal Church | An act was passed which restored previously expelled Presbyterian clergy and forbade the bishops to continue their ministry. The act abolished the episcopate in the Scottish church. The Scottish Episcopal Church became the new Scottish member of the Anglican Communion. |

==== 18th century schisms ====
| Name of schism | Original location of schism | Start date | Schism resolved | Original Church body | Resulting Church bodies or schismatic bodies | Notes |
|---|---|---|---|---|---|---|
| Nonjuring schism of 1712 | Palace of Westminster, Westminster, Middlesex, England, Kingdom of Great Britain | 3 March 1712 | 24 October 1804 | Scottish Episcopal Church | Qualified chapels | The Toleration Act 1712 allowed the Episcopalians to practice as long as they swore an oath of abjuration. Following failed Jacobite risings, "qualified chapels" were limited to those clergy ordained by the Churches of England and Ireland. After the death of the Jacobite pretender Charles Edward Stuart, the Episcopalians started to abandon their resistance against the ruling dynasty. The qualified chapels gradually merged into the Episcopal Church after the church adopted the Thirty-nine Articles of the Anglican church. |
| Non-subscribing schism | Dungannon, County Tyrone, Ulster, Kingdom of Ireland | 25 June 1726 | – | Synod of Ulster | Presbytery of Antrim | On the Synod of Dungannon, ministers who did not subscribed to the Westminster Confession of Faith were expelled. |
| First Secession | Scotland, Kingdom of Great Britain | December 1733 | 2 October 1929 | Church of Scotland | Associate Presbytery | The dispute ties back to the Church Patronage Act of 1711. They merged with other offspring. The majority of the latest iteration United Free Church of Scotland merged back in 1929. |
| Old Side–New Side controversy | Philadelphia, Philadelphia County, Province of Pennsylvania, Thirteen Colonies, British Empire | 27 May 1741 | 29 May 1759 | Synod of Philadelphia | Synod of New York | Part of the Old and New Lights controversy. |
| Burgher Oath schism | Edinburgh, Scotland, Kingdom of Great Britain | 10 April 1747 | 8 September 1820 (New Lights); 1852 (Old Lights) | Associate Presbytery | Burghers; Anti-Burgher | |
| Second Secession | Colinsburgh, Fife, Scotland, Kingdom of Great Britain | 1761 | 2 October 1929 | Church of Scotland | Relief Church | The split occurred after the Inverkeithing case which is also related to the 1711 act. They merged with other offspring. The majority of the latest iteration United Free Church of Scotland merged back in 1929. |
| Anglican-Methodist schism in the United States | Lovely Lane Chapel, Baltimore, Baltimore County, State of Maryland, United States of America | December 1784 | – | Church of England | Methodist Episcopal Church | John Wesley ordained ministers for America on 1 September 1784, but the formal establishment of the Methodist Episcopal Church was dated from the Christmas Conference in December 1784. In 1788, Thomas Coke attempted a secret unification with the Episcopal Church, which was ultimately blocked by Francis Asbury. |
| Anglican-Episcopal schism | Philadelphia, Philadelphia County, Commonwealth of Pennsylvania, United States of America | 27 September 1785 | 1789 | Church of England | Episcopal Church | After the US Congress adopted the Declaration of Independence on 4 July 1776, several states passed laws making prayers for the British monarch and parliament acts of treason. The Episcopal Church was then organized in 1785. Communion with the Church of England was formally restored in 1789. |
| Swedenborgian movement | England and Wales, Kingdom of Great Britain | 7 May 1787 | – | Church of England | The New Church | In 1787, 15 years after Emanuel Swedenborg's death, his followers formally founded the New Church. Part of Restorationism. |
| Anglican-Methodist schism in Great Britain | England and Wales, Kingdom of Great Britain | 1795 | – | Church of England | Wesleyan Methodist Church | Formal schism between the English Anglicans and Methodists was entrenched by the decision of the Methodist Conference of 1795 to permit the administration of the Lord's Supper in any chapel where both a majority of the trustees and a majority of the stewards and leaders allowed it. |
| Burgher schism | Scotland, Kingdom of Great Britain | 1799 | 1900 | Burghers | Auld Lichts; New Lichts | Part of the Old and New Lights dispute. The Auld Licht Burgher returned to the Church of Scotland before leaving during the Disruption. Both factions finally reunited in the United Free Church of Scotland. |

==== 19th century schisms ====
| Name of schism | Original location of schism | Start date | Schism resolved | Original Church body | Resulting Church bodies or schismatic bodies | Notes |
|---|---|---|---|---|---|---|
| Stone movement | Cane Ridge Meeting House, Cane Ridge, Bourbon County, Commonwealth of Kentucky, United States of America | 10 September 1803 | – | Presbyterian Church in the United States of America | Springfield Presbytery | On 10 September 1803, Barton W. Stone and others formed the Springfield presbytery, breaking away from the Kentucky Synod of the Presbyterian Church. Later, the presbytery was dissolved on 28 June 1804 and they adopted the name "Christian" to identify their group. Most of this movement united with the Campbell movement on 1 January 1832 with a handshake between Stone and "Raccoon" John Smith, to become the Restoration Movement. Part of Restorationism. |
| Unitarian controversy | Harvard Divinity School, Cambridge, Middlesex County, Commonwealth of Massachusetts, United States of America | 1804 | – | Congregational churches | American Unitarian Association | The schism broke out when Henry Ware replaced David Tappan, a moderate Calvinist, as Hollis Professor of Divinity. It had its roots in the Old and New Lights dispute of the 1740s. |
| Anti-Burgher schism | Scotland, Kingdom of Great Britain | 1806 | 1900 | Anti-Burghers | Auld Lichts; New Lichts | Part of the Old and New Lights dispute. The majority of the Auld Licht Burghers joined the Free Church of Scotland and eventually reunited with the New Lights in the United Free Church of Scotland. |
| Campbell movement | Washington, Washington County, Commonwealth of Pennsylvania, United States of America | 7 September 1809 | – | Associate Reformed Presbyterian Church | Christian Association of Washington | On 17 August 1809, Thomas Campbell and 21 of his associates formed the Christian Association of Washington, which becomes the Brush Run Church on 4 May 1811. Later they adopted the name "Disciples". They eventually merged with the above-mentioned Stone movement. Part of Restorationism. |
| Arian schism in Ireland | Cookstown, County Tyrone, Ireland, United Kingdom of Great Britain and Ireland | 18 August 1829 | – | Synod of Ulster | Remonstrant Synod of Ulster | Part of the Old and New Lights controversy. |
| Old Lutheran schism | Breslau, Province of Silesia, Kingdom of Prussia | c. 1830 | – | Prussian Union of Churches | Old Lutherans | |
| Afscheiding of 1834 | Ulrum, Provincie Groningen, Kingdom of the Netherlands | 14 October 1834 | – | Dutch Reformed Church | Reformed Churches under the Cross; Separated Christian Congregations | |
| Irving movement | Annan, Annandale, Dumfriesshire, Scotland, United Kingdom of Great Britain and Ireland | 14 July 1835 | – | Church of Scotland | Irvingians | Edward Irving was deposed on the charges of heresy in March 1833. He died on 7 December 1834, and then in 14 July 1835, his followers formally established the Catholic Apostolic Church. Part of Restorationism. |
| Thomas movement | United States of America | 1837 | – | Restoration Movement | John Thomas and his associates | John Thomas was disfellowshipped on 1837, but his movement didn't have any official name until 1864, when it became "Christadelphians", to enable them to be conscientious objectors. Part of Restorationism. |
| Old School–New School controversy | United States of America | 1837 | 1864 (South); 1870 (North) | Presbyterian Church in the United States of America | New School Presbyterians | Each faction split further during the American Civil War. |
| Prayer controversy of Magdeburg | Gnadau, Province of Saxony, Kingdom of Prussia, German Confederation (Note: Gnadau, Provinz Sachsen, Königreich Preußen, Deutscher Bund) | 29 June 1841 | – | Prussian Union of Churches | Friends of the Light | In 1859, it merged with German Catholics to form the Union of Free Religious Congregations in Germany. |
| Disruption of 1843 | Scotland, United Kingdom of Great Britain and Ireland | 23 May 1843 | 2 October 1929 (majority) | Church of Scotland | Free Church of Scotland | The main conflict was over whether the Church of Scotland or the British Government had the power to control clerical positions and benefits. On 18 May 1843, 121 ministers and 73 elders led by David Welsh met at the Church of St Andrew in George Street, Edinburgh. After Welsh read a Protest, the group left St. Andrews and walked down the hill to the Tanfield Hall at Canonmills. There they held the first meeting of the Free Church of Scotland, the Disruption Assembly. Thomas Chalmers was appointed the first Moderator. On 23 May 1843, a second meeting was held for the signing of the Act of Separation by the ministers. Eventually, 474 of about 1,200 ministers left the Church of Scotland for the Free Church. The majority merged into the United Free Church of Scotland which returned to the Church of Scotland in 1929. |
| Anglican schism of 1844 | United Kingdom of Great Britain and Ireland | 1844 | – | Church of England | Free Church of England | |
| Armenian Evangelical schism | Constantinople, Constantinople Sanjak, Rumelia Eyalet, Ottoman Empire | 1 July 1846 | – | Armenian Apostolic Church | Armenian Evangelical Church | Part of Eastern Protestant reformations/schisms. |
| Booth movement | East End of London, Middlesex, England and Wales, United Kingdom of Great Britain and Ireland | 1861 | – | Methodist New Connexion | William Booth and his associates | William Booth became an independent evangelist in 1861, and with his wife Catherine founded the East London Christian Mission on 2 July 1865 in the East End of London. The name "The Salvation Army" developed from an incident on 19 and 20 May 1878. Part of Holiness movement. |
| Irvingian schism of 1863 | Berlin, Province of Brandenburg, Kingdom of Prussia, German Confederation (Note: Berlin, Provinz Brandenburg, Königreich Preußen, Deutscher Bund) | 6 February 1863 | – | Catholic Apostolic Church | Hamburg congregation | Francis Woodhouse wrote the formal expulsion of the Hamburg congregation, which eventually became the New Apostolic Church. Part of Restorationism. |
| Mar Thoma schism | Diyarbakir, Diyarbakir Sanjak, Kurdistan Eyalet, Ottoman Empire (Note: Āmid/Diyār-i Bekr, Sancak-i Diyār-i Bekr, Eyâlet-ı Kurdistan, Devlet-i ʿAlīye-i ʿOs̱mānīye) | 3 April 1865 | – | Malankara Church | Mar Thoma Syrian Church | Part of Eastern Protestant reformations/schisms. |
| Free Protestant movement | Worms, Provinz Rheinhessen, Grand Duchy of Hesse, German Empire (Note: Worms, Provinz Rheinhessen, Großherzogtum Hessen und bei Rhein, Deutscher Reich) | 5 November 1875 | – | Evangelical Church in Hessen | Free Protestants | |
| Salvation Army schism of 1884 | United States of America | 24 October 1884 | – | Salvation Army | Salvation Army of America | The international Salvation Army sued the Salvation Army of America, and in 1913 it became American Rescue Workers. |
| Doleantie of 1886 | Bijbelgordel | 7 February 1886 | 1 May 2004 | Dutch Reformed Church | Reformed Churches in the Netherlands | |
| Salvation Army schism of 1892 | Dominion of Canada | 30 September 1892 | – | Salvation Army | United Christian Workers | United Christian Workers became the Christian Workers' Church of Canada in 1922, and then Associated Gospel Churches in 1925. It was federally incorporated March 18, 1925. |
| Salvation Army schism of 1896 | Cooper Union, Manhattan, New York County, State of New York, United States of America | 8 March 1896 | – | Salvation Army | Volunteers of America | Ballington and his wife Maud Booth founded the Volunteers of America in 8 March 1896 after disagreements with other Salvation Army leaders, including Ballington Booth's brother Bramwell Booth. |

==== 20th century schisms ====
| Name of schism | Original location of schism | Start date | Schism resolved | Original Church body | Resulting Church bodies or schismatic bodies | Notes |
|---|---|---|---|---|---|---|
| Liberal Catholic movement | England and Wales, United Kingdom of Great Britain and Ireland | 13 February 1916 | – | Church of England | Liberal Catholic Church | J. I. Wedgwood and Charles Webster Leadbeater, two Theosophists, founded the church. Wedgwood had been consecrated as a bishop in 1916 in England by Frederick Samuel Willoughby; Willoughby had been consecrated as bishop by Arnold Harris Mathew of the Old Roman Catholic Church in Great Britain, but had later been disowned by Mathew. Wedgwood then travelled to Australia and ordained and consecrated Leadbeater. |
| Czechoslovak schism of 1924 | Praha, Bohemia, Czechoslovak Republic (Note: Praha, Čechy, Československá republika) | 30 August 1924 | – | Czechoslovak Hussite Church | Orthodox Church of the Czech Lands and Slovakia | The split occurred over apostolic succession. |
| Split of 1924 | United States of America | c. 1924 | – | Christian Reformed Church in North America | Protestant Reformed Churches in America | |
| Kirchenkampf | Dahlem, Zehlendorf, Berlin, Freistaat Preußen, German Reich | 20 October 1934 | 31 August 1945 | German Evangelical Church | Confessing Church | After the war, the Evangelical Church in Germany was founded. |
| PCUSA schism of 1936 | Philadelphia, Philadelphia County, Commonwealth of Pennsylvania, United States of America | 11 June 1936 | – | Presbyterian Church in the United States of America | Presbyterian Church of America | In 1939, after PCUSA filed a lawsuit against the fledgling denomination for its name choice, the denomination adopted its current name, the Orthodox Presbyterian Church (OPC). Part of Fundamentalist–modernist controversy. |
| GPdI schism of 1952 | City of Surabaya, Province of East Java, Republic of Indonesia (Note: Kota Surabaya, Provinsi Jawa Timur, Republik Indonesia) | 11 January 1952 | – | Pentecostal Church in Indonesia | Bethel Full Gospel Church of Indonesia | |
| STECI schism of 1961 | Kerala, Republic of India | 1961 | – | Mar Thoma Syrian Church | St. Thomas Evangelical Church of India | |
| Lutheran schism of 1963 | United States of America | 1963 | – | Evangelical Lutheran Synodical Conference of North America | Lutheran Church–Missouri Synod; Wisconsin Evangelical Lutheran Synod; Evangelical Lutheran Synod | The churches started to terminate their fellowships from 1955. ELS and WELS remain in fellowship after they left the conference. |
| Anglican schism of 1966 | Kerala, Republic of India | 1966 | – | Church of South India | CMS Anglican Church | Founded by Dalit Christians and sees itself as the true Anglican church in India as opposed to the Syrian dominated united CSI. |
| GBIS schism of 1970 | City of Sukabumi, Province of West Java, Republic of Indonesia (Note: Kota Sukabumi, Provinsi Jawa Barat, Republik Indonesia) | 6 October 1970 | – | Bethel Full Gospel Church of Indonesia | Indonesian Bethel Church | |
| Church of God schism of 1972 | Kerala, Republic of India | 1972 | – | Church of God (Full Gospel) in India | Church of God (Kerala Division); Church of God (Kerala State) | The church was divided across caste lines. |
| GKT schism of 1976 | City of Surabaya, Province of East Java, Republic of Indonesia | 5 October 1976 | – | Indonesian Christ the Lord Church | Indonesian Abdiel Christian Church | |
| LCMS schism of 1976 | Philadelphia, Philadelphia County, Commonwealth of Pennsylvania, United States of America | 3 December 1976 | – | Lutheran Church–Missouri Synod | Association of Evangelical Lutheran Churches | During the 1960s, many clergy and members of the LCMS grew concerned about the direction of education at their flagship seminary, Concordia Seminary, in St. Louis, Missouri. Professors at Concordia Seminary had, in the 1950s and 1960s, begun to utilize the historical-critical method to analyze the Bible rather than the traditional historical-grammatical method that considered scripture to be the inerrant Word of God. After attempts at compromise failed, on January 20, 1974, the seminary Board of Control chose to suspend the seminary president John Tietjen, leading to a walkout of most faculty and students, and the formation of Seminex. 200 liberal and moderate congregations split from the LCMS to form the Association of Evangelical Lutheran Churches (AELC), leaving the LCMS a more conservative body than it had been in 1969. The AELC itself would later merge with other liberal and moderate Lutheran churches to form the Evangelical Lutheran Church in America (ELCA). Part of Fundamentalist–modernist controversy. |
| Continuing Anglican movement | City of St. Louis, State of Missouri, United States of America | 16 September 1977 | – | Episcopal Church; Anglican Church of Canada | Fellowship of Concerned Churchmen | In 1976, the General Convention of the Episcopal Church in the United States of America voted to approve the ordination of women to the priesthood and the episcopate, and also provisionally adopted a new and doctrinally controversial Book of Common Prayer, later called the 1979 version. Between 14–16 September 1977, several thousand dissenting clergy and laypersons responded to those actions by meeting in St. Louis, Missouri, under the auspices of the Fellowship of Concerned Churchmen, where they adopted a theological statement, the Affirmation of St. Louis. The Affirmation expressed a determination "to continue in the Catholic Faith, Apostolic Order, Orthodox Worship, and Evangelical Witness of the traditional Anglican Church, doing all things necessary for the continuance of the same". Out of this meeting came a new church with the provisional name "Anglican Church in North America (Episcopal)". The first bishops of the new church, later named the Anglican Catholic Church, were consecrated on 28 January 1978, in Denver, Colorado. |
| SBC schism of 1987 | Providence Baptist Church, Charlotte, State of North Carolina, United States of America | 12 February 1987 | – | Southern Baptist Convention | Southern Baptist Alliance | The Southern Baptist Alliance subsequently changed its name to the Alliance of Baptists in 1992. |
| GKA schism of 1989 | Granadha Building, Administrative city of South Jakarta, Special Capital Region of Jakarta, Republic of Indonesia (Note: Kota administrasi Jakarta Selatan, Daerah Khusus Ibukota Jakarta, Republik Indonesia) | September 1989 | – | Indonesian Abdiel Christian Church | Indonesian Reformed Evangelical Church | |
| GBI schism of 1990 | Special Capital Region of Jakarta, Republic of Indonesia (Note: Daerah Khusus Ibukota Jakarta, Republik Indonesia) | 17 August 1990 | – | Indonesian Bethel Church | Tiberias Ministry | |

==== 21th century schisms ====
| Name of schism | Original location of schism | Start date | Schism resolved | Original Church body | Resulting Church bodies or schismatic bodies | Notes |
|---|---|---|---|---|---|---|
| GBI schism of 2001 | City of Surabaya, Province of East Java, Republic of Indonesia | 2001 | – | Indonesian Bethel Church | Indonesian Rose of Sharon Church | |
| GBI schism of 2002 | Special Capital Region of Jakarta, Republic of Indonesia | 19 July 2002 | – | Indonesian Bethel Church | Indonesian Antioch Gospel Church | |
| SBC schism of 2002 | Atlanta, Fulton County, State of Georgia, United States of America | 2002 | – | Southern Baptist Convention | Cooperative Baptist Fellowship | |
| GBI schism of 2003 | City of Surabaya, Province of East Java, Republic of Indonesia | 17 January 2003 | – | Indonesian Bethel Church | Bethany Indonesian Church | |
| Anglican schism of 2008 | West Chicago, DuPage County, State of Illinois, United States of America | 3 December 2008 | – | Episcopal Church; Anglican Church of Canada | Common Cause Partnership | The partnership founded the Anglican Church in North America on 22 June 2009. Part of Anglican realignment. |
| Lutheran schism of 2010 | Grove City, Franklin County, State of Ohio, United States of America | 27 August 2010 | – | Evangelical Lutheran Church in America; Evangelical Lutheran Church in Canada | North American Lutheran Church | |
| Bethany schism of 2012 | Kota Makassar, Provinsi Sulawesi Selatan, Republic of Indonesia | 13 August 2012 | – | Bethany Indonesian Church | id:YHS Church | |
| PCUSA schism of 2012 | Orlando, Orange County, State of Florida, United States of America | January 2012 | – | Presbyterian Church in the United States of America | ECO: A Covenant Order of Evangelical Presbyterians | |
| GBI schism of 2018 | Special Capital Region of Jakarta, Republic of Indonesia | 9 October 2018 | – | Indonesian Bethel Church | Voice of the Gospel Truth Church | |
| Methodist schism of 2022 | United States of America | 1 May 2022 | – | United Methodist Church | Global Methodist Church | |
| Anglican schism of 2022 | Commonwealth of Australia | August 2022 | – | Anglican Church of Australia | Diocese of the Southern Cross | Part of Anglican realignment. |
| GMS schism of 2024 | City of Surabaya, Province of East Java, Republic of Indonesia | December 2024 | – | Indonesian Rose of Sharon Church | Gospel Mission Stewards Church | |

=== Modern schisms from non-Protestant denominations ===
| Name of schism | Original location of schism | Start date | Schism resolved | Original Church body | Resulting Church bodies or schismatic bodies | Notes |
|---|---|---|---|---|---|---|
| Saint Thomas Christian schism | Southern India | c. 1665 | – | Malabar Church | Syro-Malabar Church; Malankara Church | After Coonan Cross Oath led to the first split among the Saint Thomas Christians. Thoma I was ordained by Gregorios Abdal Jaleel of the Syriac Orthodox Church. His cousin Palliveettil Chandy was consecrated by Catholic bishop Joseph Sebastiani leading to a schism between the Eastern Catholic Pazhayakoottukar and Oriental Orthodox Puthankoottukar. |
| Russian schism of 1666 | Moskva, Tsardom of Russia | April 1666 | – | Russian Orthodox Church | Old Believers | Between 1653 and 1656, Patriarch Nikon of Moscow introduced numerous reforms to liturgical and ritual practices of the Russian Church. Tsar Alexis attempted to reconcile the controversy by convening the 1666–1667 Great Moscow Synod, where the old rite was anathemized and declared heretical, and the reformed rite was proclaimed universally binding, and in which ironically also saw the deposition of Patriarch Nikon. By the 1690s, the turbulence gradually waned, as Peter the Great relaxed the persecution of nonconformists, and the apocalyptic zeal diminished as the world evidently did not end. In the following decades, the surviving dissenter communities who retained the old forms mostly evolved into the Old Believers, a loose movement defined by rejection of Nikon's reforms, but also to more radical sectarians like the Khlysts (flagellants). |
| Thozhiyoor schism of 1772 | Kerala, India | 1772 | – | Malankara Church | Malabar Independent Syrian Church | |
| German Catholic movement | Leipzig, Kreishauptmannschaft Leipzig, Königreich Sachsen, Deutscher Bund | 23 March 1845 | – | Catholic Church | German Catholics | In the 15 October 1844 issue of the Sächsische Vaterlandsblätter, Johannes Ronge, a Roman Catholic priest in Silesia, published a vigorous attack upon Wilhelm Arnoldi, bishop of Trier since 1842, for having ordered (for the first time since 1810) the exposition of the alleged seamless robe of Jesus, an event that drew countless pilgrims to the cathedral. Bishop Arnoldi had proclaimed that the artifact had healing powers, and accompanied the exhibition of the holy coat by a promise of plenary indulgence to whoever should make a pilgrimage to Trier to honor it. Ronge denounced the projected pilgrimages as idolatry. Ronge, who had formerly been chaplain at Grottkau, was then a schoolmaster at Laurahütte. He had already been suspended from his charge on account of his independent views. Ronge's article made a great sensation, and led to his excommunication by the chapter of Breslau in December 1844. The ex-priest received much public sympathy, and a dissenting congregation calling itself the "New Catholics" was soon formed at Breslau. They were later forced to change their name from "New Catholics" to "German Catholics". In 1859, it merged with Friends of the Light to form the Union of Free Religious Congregations in Germany. |
| Old Catholic movement | Minga, Regiarungsbeziak Obabayern, Kinereich Bayern, German Empire | 24 September 1871 | – | Catholic Church | Old Catholic Church | After the First Vatican Council (1869–1870), several groups of Catholics in Austria-Hungary, German Empire, and Switzerland rejected the Catholic dogma of Papal infallibility in matters of faith and morals, and left to form their own churches. From 22–24 September 1871, a convention in Munich attracted several hundred participants, including Church of England and Protestant observers. Döllinger, an excommunicated Catholic priest and church historian, was a notable leader of the movement but was never a member of an Old Catholic church. Later on, these churches formed the Union of Utrecht of the Old Catholic Churches. |
| Goan Schism | Brahmavar, Udipi, Karnataka, India | 29 July 1889 | – | Catholic Church | Konkani Orthodox Church | Alvares Mar Julius was excommunicated from the Catholic Church, stripped naked & paraded through the streets. He left the church with some hundreds of Catholic Christian families in what was Portuguese Goa; to join the Malankara Orthodox Syrian Church in British India. |
| Aglipayan schism | Centro de Bellas Artes, Quiapo, City of Manila, Philippine Insular Government, United States of America | 3 August 1902 | – | Catholic Church | Philippine Independent Church | Following the end of the Philippine–American War, Isabelo de los Reyes, together with the members of Unión Obrera Democrática Filipina, formally founded and publicly proclaimed the commencement of the Iglesia Filipina Independiente (abbreviated as IFI and translated to "Philippine Independent Church" in English) on 3 August 1902. |
| Malankara schism of 1912 | Kerala, India | 1912 | – | Malankara Syrian Church | Malankara Orthodox Syrian Church; Malankara Jacobite Syrian Church | A long-standing schism between the autocephalous Malankara Orthodox Syrian Church and the autonomous Malankara Jacobite Syrian Church under the Syriac Orthodox Church. Though it originated in 1912, it remains a major 21st-century conflict with a terminal legal conclusion made by the Supreme Court of India in 2017. |
| Malankara schism of 1930 | Kerala, India | 1930 | – | Malankara Syrian Church | Syro-Malankara Catholic Church | A faction of the Malankara Church formed a full communion with the Catholic Church. |
| Mariavite schism of 1935 | Second Polish Republic | 29 January 1935 | – | Mariavite Church | Catholic Mariavite Church | The schism was result of the deposition of Maria Michał Kowalski. |
| Greek Old Calendarist schism of 1935 | Republic of Greece | 26 May 1935 N.S. | – | Church of Greece | Old Calendarists in Greece | The Church of Greece adopted the Revised Julian calendar, also called 'New Calendar' in 1924. At first, resistance to it was muted, with a small number of laymen, priests and monks, whose number grew over the years. The situation changed in 1935 when three Church of Greece bishops joined the movement and consecrated four new bishops. Metropolitan Chrysostomos (Kavourides) of Florina emerged to become its leader. Three out of those seven bishops ended up rejoining the Church of Greece, and the four remaining ones created the Old Calendarist Holy Synod on 13 May 1935. Part of True Orthodox movement. |
| Greek Old Calendarist schism of 1937 | Kingdom of Greece | 18 September 1937 N.S. | – | Old Calendarists in Greece | Chrysostomos (Kavourides) line Matthaios (Karpoudakis) line | The Greek Old Calendarists experienced schism in 1937, due to a disagreement on the validity of the sacraments performed by members of churches which have adopted the reformed calendar. After Chrysostomos, head of the Holy Synod, refused to declare the sacraments of the New Calendarists as graceless, bishop Matthew led the group which seceded from the Holy Synod. Part of True Orthodox movement. |
| American-Ruthenian Schism | United States of America | 1938 | - | Ruthenian Greek Catholic Church | American Carpatho-Russian Orthodox Diocese | Orestes (Chornock) of Agathonikeia led 37 Uniate parishes into jurisdiction of Ecumenical Patriarchate of Constantinople following series of Latinizations by Papacy and Latin-rite American hierarchy. |
| Romanian Old Calendarist schism of 1955 | Socialist Republic of Romania | 5 April 1955 | – | Romanian Orthodox Church | Old Calendarists in Romania | The Romanian Orthodox Church adopted the revised calendar in 1924, which fomented the Old Calendarist movement there. The abbot of Prokof, Glycerius Tănase, became the head of the movement. The Greek Old Calendarist hierarchs did not manage to consecrate him a bishop due to the interventions from the Greek state., and so the Old Calendarist movement in Romania was only composed of priests and laypeople, including several hundreds monks from Mount Athos until 1955, when Metropolitan Galaction Cordun joined the movement. Since December 2022, the Old Calendar Orthodox Church of Romania is not in communion with any other groups. Part of True Orthodox movement. |
| Sedevacantist movement | St. Peter's Basilica, Vatican City | c. 1963 | – | Catholic Church | Sedevacantist groups | The movement believes in a permanent sede vacante since the 1958 conclave, 1963 conclave or the Second Vatican Council. |
| Assyrian schism of 1964 | St. Zaia Cathedral, Baġdād, Muḥāfaẓat Baġdād, Republic of Iraq | 1964 | – | Church of the East | Ancient Church of the East | |
| Schism of Montaner | Orthodox Church of Montaner, Montaner, Comune di Sarmede, Provincia di Treviso, Regione del Veneto, Italian Republic | 26 December 1967 | – | Roman Catholic Diocese of Vittorio Veneto | almost all parishioners in Montaner | Today, the Catholic and Eastern Orthodox communities still exist within the village, though divisions remain. |
| Palmarian movement | La Alcaparrosa, El Palmar de Troya, Provincia de Sevilla, Comunidad autónoma de Andalucía, Kingdom of Spain | 6 August 1978 | – | Catholic Church | Palmarian Christian Church | The origins of the Palmarian Christian Church, commonly known as the Palmarian (Catholic) Church, as a distinct body can be traced back to the alleged Marian apparitions of Our Lady of Palmar, which took place in Andalusia, Spain, from 1968 onward. |
| Giguère movement | Cathedral Basilica of Notre-Dame de Québec, Quebec City, Province of Quebec, Canada | 4 May 1987 | – | Catholic Church | Community of the Lady of All Nations | It was founded in 1971 by Marie-Paule Giguère in Quebec as a prayer group, and then was formally approved as a Roman Catholic "pious association" in 1975, but was rescinded by the Archbishop of Quebec after Giguère announced herself the reincarnation of the Blessed Virgin Mary. On 4 May 1987, the Archbishop of Quebec, Cardinal Louis-Albert Vachon, withdrew the approval of his predecessor, and on declared the movement schismatic and disqualified it as a Catholic association due to its false teachings. On 11 July 2007, the Congregation for the Doctrine of the Faith issued a declaration of excommunication against the group for heretical teachings and beliefs after a six-year investigation. The declaration was announced by the Canadian Conference of Catholic Bishops on 12 September 2007. |
| Lefebvrian schism of 1988 | Écône, Commune de Riddes, District de Martigny, Canton du Valais, Swiss Confederation | 30 June 1988 | | Catholic Church | Priestly Fraternity of Saint Pius X | The Priestly Fraternity of Saint Pius X, commonly known as the Society of Saint Pius X, is a Traditionalist Catholic priestly fraternity founded in 1970 by Archbishop Marcel Lefebvre. Tensions between the Society and the Holy See climaxed with the 1988 Écône consecrations when Archbishop Lefebvre consecrated four bishops without the papal Mandate and against a personal warning by Pope John Paul II, resulting in the papal declaration that all the consecrators and the consecratees had incurred Latæ Sententiæ excommunication. On 24 January 2009, Pope Benedict XVI lifted the excommunications of the four consecratees, but the Society did not return into full communion with the Holy See. As of 1 July 2026, due to yet another consecrations in Écône, members of the society again become subjects of another round of Latæ Sententiæ excommunications. |
| Teruel movement | Republic of the Philippines | 13 July 1991 | – | Catholic Church | Holy Trinity Catholic movement | It started in the early 1970s as the Holy Trinity Catholic movement, a Catholic lay organization in Hermosa, Bataan founded by Maria Virginia Leonzon. On 13 July 1991 her son, John Florentine Teruel, was consecrated patriarch by Old Catholic and Orthodox bishops, and the organization formally separated itself from the Catholic Church. It was then registered as the Apostolic Catholic Church on 7 June 1992. By that time, the movement had already spread throughout the Philippines, Hong Kong, Australia, Canada and the United States of America. |
| Bulgarian Old Calendarist schism of 1993 | Republic of Bulgaria | 17 January 1993 | – | Bulgarian Orthodox Church | Old Calendarists in Bulgaria | The Bulgarian Orthodox Church adopted the revised Julian calendar in 1968. The Protection Convent near Sofia became a center of the resistance to this adoption. In 1993, Fotiy Siromakhov of Triadista was consecrated bishop by the Cyprianite Old Calendarist Church to be hierarch of the Bulgarian Old Calendarists. On 16 December 2024, the Supreme Court of Cassation ruled in favor of the Old Calendar Bulgarian Orthodox Church entering the register of religious denominations. This action was accepted by the Bulgarian Orthodox Church as the creation of a schism. Part of True Orthodox movement. |
| ROCOR schism of 1994 | Francis F. Palmer House, Manhattan, New York County, State of New York, United States of America | 5 April 1994 | – | Russian Orthodox Church Outside of Russia | Russian Orthodox Free Church | The Russian Orthodox Free Church later became Russian Orthodox Autonomous Church in October 1998. Part of True Orthodox movement. |
| ROCOR schism of 2001 | Canada | October 2001 | – | Russian Orthodox Church Outside of Russia | Russian Orthodox Church in Exile | This movement later renamed themselves Russian Orthodox Church Outside of Russia; in common parlance ROCOR-Vitaly or ROCOR(V). Part of True Orthodox movement. |
| Athos schism of 2002 | Esphigmenou, Mount Athos, Hellenic Republic | 14 December 2002 | – | Ecumenical Patriarchate of Constantinople | Esphigmenou monks | Part of True Orthodox movement. |

== See also ==
- Ecclesiastical separatism
- Old and New Lights
