= Martin Rakovský =

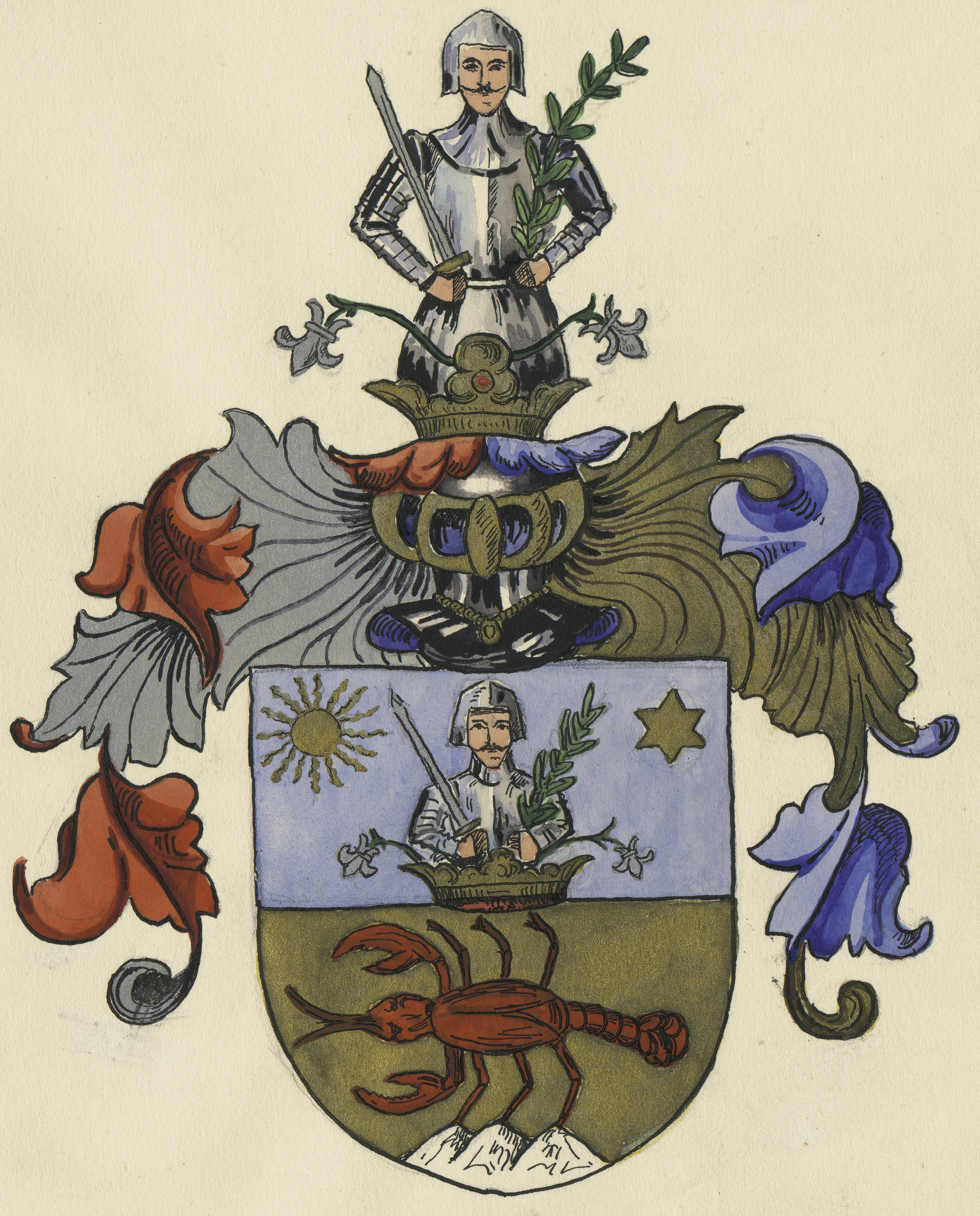
- Born: ca. 1535; Rákó, Kingdom of Hungary (today Rakovo, Slovakia)
- Died: 8 October 1579; Kutná Hora, Kingdom of Bohemia (today Czech Republic)
- Occupations: Poet, preacher and humanist scholar.

Martin Rakovský (Hungarian: Rakovszky Márton, Latin: Martinus Rakocius de Rakow or Martinus Rakowsky de Rakow; c. 1535 – 28 September 1579) was a Renaissance-era Hungarian poet and humanist scholar during the mid-16th century.

== Life ==
He was born around the year 1535 in the village of Rakouch (Rakovo), in Turóc County, which is now in the Martin District of the Žilina Region in Slovakia. Before 1554, he studied at the school in Körmöczbánya/Kremnitz, now Kremnica. Thereafter, he moved on to Bártfa/Bártfeld, now Bardejov, where he studied with noted humanist Leonard Stöckel, and later Brassó/Kronstadt, now Brașov before spending 1555–56 at the University of Wittenberg studying under Philip Melanchthon, an associate of Martin Luther. In 1556, Rakovský studied in Prague briefly before returning to Wittenberg to earn his master's degree, which he did in 1558. During his time of education, he served in northern Bohemia as rector of the schools in Žatec in 1556 and then at Louny from 1557–1559. Between 1559–1569, Rakovszky served as a clark of the Royal Chamber of Hungary in Pozsony, Pressburg in German, now Bratislava, which was the capital of Royal Hungary at that time as the country's historical capital Buda (now part of Budapest) was occupied by the Ottoman Turks in 1541. During Turkish incursions into the region during the late 1560s, Rakovszky stayed at the mansion in Turóckelemenfalva, now Kaľamenová where he participated in defending his family's property against the Turks in 1569. Rakovszky died suddenly on a visit to his brother Miklós's house in Kutná Hora in 1579.

== Historical context and family ==
The Rakovszky family name went through a number of variations over the years, including: de Rakouch, Rakouczky, Rakoczy, Rakovsky, Rakovszky. All of which are found in the "Royal books" (Liber Regis). His ancestor László de Chernek was in the entourage of the Hungarian king Béla IV in the Battle of Mohi against the Tartars/Mongols in 1242. For his and his brother's (Márton de Chernek, a royal chaplain) loyalty they were given estates at Zanasan in Turócz, while still retaining some south-east of lake Balaton. (Documents from 127x).

== Work ==
He was one of the most accomplished and widely known humanist scholars of the 16th century, with some of his work gaining notice in a larger European context. During his studies in Wittenberg, he published a verse translation of the astronomy textbook Procli sphaera. Upon arrival in Prague, he soon became part of the humanistic scholarship ring of Jan, Elder of Hodějov. Elder Jan influenced Rakovský's poems in his work Elegiae et epigrammata (1556), which mostly included hymns and poems written in honor of prominent personalities of the then current Czech life. Rakovszky further developed his poetry by focusing on humanistic civil and political poetry during his time in Loun. The city of Prague is celebrated in his work Boiemicae Lunae Descriptio Urbis (1558) wherein there are hymns dedicated to the city and its character, prayer, speech and exercises, as well as other incidental poems. After arriving in Pozsony (now Bratislava, a name invented much after his death), Rakovszky wrote Libellus de partibus reipublicae et causis mutationum regnorum imperiorumque, a civil and political commentary dedicated to Emperor Maximilian II. This work analyzed the social strata in the country and indicated its place and function in society.

== Some of his works ==
- 1556 – Elegiae et epigrammata, a collection of epigrams and elegies
- 1563 – Palusus, a poem celebrating the coronation of King Maximilian
- 1574 – De magistratu politico, the author's most important work. Originally there were to have been nine volumes, but ultimately only three were written.
