= Rhine league =

Rhine league may refer to:

- League of the Rhine, a 17th century defensive union between German princes and France
- Rhenish League of Cities, various alliances between German imperial cities in the 12th–15th centuries
- Rheinischer Bund, or Rhine League, an organisation against robber barons

== See also ==
- Confederation of the Rhine, an 18th century alliance
