= Shimun XVI Yohannan =

Assyrian Church of the East Patriarch from 1780 to 1820

Mar Shimun XVI Yohannan
- Patriarch
- Church: Assyrian Church of the East
- Diocese: Patriarchal Diocese of Qodshanis
- See: Holy Apostolic See of Seleucia-Ctesiphon
- Installed: 1780 (Patriarch of the Shem'on line)
- Term ended: 1820
- Predecessor: Shimun XV Maqdassi Mikhail as Patriarch of the Shem'on line
- Successor: Shimun XVII Abraham

Orders
- Rank: Catholicos-Patriarch

Personal details
- Born: Qodshanis, Hakkari, Ottoman Empire
- Died: 1820 Qodshanis, Hakkari, Ottoman Empire
- Denomination: Eastern Christian, Church of the East
- Residence: Qodshanis, Hakkari, Ottoman Empire

Mar Shimun XVI Yohannan (also Shemon XVI Yohannan) was Patriarch of the Shem'on line (inQodshanis) of the Assyrian Church of the East, from 1780 to 1820. In 1804, he became the sole patriach of an anti-Catholic faction of the historic Church of the East after his rival, Patriarch Eliya XII of the historic Eliya line, was succeeded by his cousin Yohannan VIII Hormizd, who continued the Eliya line as the patriarchs of the Chaldean Catholic Church.

== Biography ==
Until 1804, there were two rival patriarchal lines among traditionalist Christians of the Church of the East, senior Eliya line in Alqosh and junior Shemon line in Qochanis. The last patriarch of the senior line, Eliya XII, died in 1804 and was buried in the ancient Rabban Hormizd Monastery. His branch decided not to elect a new patriarch, thus ending that line, and eventually enabling the remaining patriarch Shimun XVI of the junior line to become the sole primate of the entire traditionalist community.

== See also ==
- Patriarch of the Church of the East
- List of patriarchs of the Church of the East

== Sources ==
- Baum, Wilhelm; Winkler, Dietmar W. (2003). The Church of the East: A Concise History. London-New York: Routledge-Curzon. ISBN 9781134430192.
- Baumer, Christoph (2006). The Church of the East: An Illustrated History of Assyrian Christianity. London-New York: Tauris. ISBN 9781845111151.
- Benjamin, Daniel D. (2008). The Patriarchs of the Church of the East. Piscataway: Gorgias Press. ISBN 9781463211059.
- Burleson, Samuel; Rompay, Lucas van (2011). "List of Patriarchs of the Main Syriac Churches in the Middle East". Gorgias Encyclopedic Dictionary of the Syriac Heritage. Piscataway, NJ: Gorgias Press. pp. 481–491.
- Coakley, James F. (1999). "The Patriarchal List of the Church of the East". After Bardaisan: Studies on Continuity and Change in Syriac Christianity. Louvain: Peeters Publishers. pp. 65–84. ISBN 9789042907355.
- Coakley, James F. (2001). "Mar Elia Aboona and the History of the East Syrian Patriarchate". Oriens Christianus. 85: 119–138. ISBN 9783447042871.
- Ebied, Rifaat (1972). "Some Syriac Manuscripts from the Collection of Sir E. A. Wallis Budge". Symposium Syriacum, 1972. Roma: Pontificium Institutum Orientalium Studiorum. pp. 509–539.
- Hage, Wolfgang (2007). Das Orientalische Christentum. Stuttgart: Kohlhammer Verlag. ISBN 9783170176683.
- Murre van den Berg, Heleen H. L. (1999a). "The Patriarchs of the Church of the East from the Fifteenth to Eighteenth Centuries" (PDF). Hugoye: Journal of Syriac Studies. 2 (2): 235–264. doi:10.31826/hug-2010-020119. S2CID 212688640.
- Murre van den Berg, Heleen H. L. (1999b). From a Spoken to a Written Language: The Introduction and Development of Literary Urmia Aramaic in the Nineteenth Century. Leiden: Nederlands Instituut voor het Nabije Oosten. ISBN 9789062589814.
- Spuler, Bertold (1961). "Die nestorianische Kirche". Religionsgeschichte des Orients in der Zeit der Weltreligionen. Leiden: Brill. pp. 120–169. ISBN 9789004293816.
- Wilmshurst, David (2000). The Ecclesiastical Organisation of the Church of the East, 1318–1913. Louvain: Peeters Publishers. ISBN 9789042908765.
- Wilmshurst, David (2011). The martyred Church: A History of the Church of the East. London: East & West Publishing Limited. ISBN 9781907318047.
- Wilmshurst, David (2019). "The Patriarchs of the Church of the East". The Syriac World. London: Routledge. pp. 799–805. ISBN 9781138899018.

Church of the East titles
| Preceded by Shimun XV Maqdassi Mikhail | Patriarch of the Church of the East; Shem'on line (Qodshanis); 1780 – 1820 | Succeeded by Shimun XVII Abraham (as Patriarch of the Church of the East) |
