= Lusatian League =

Alliance of six towns in Upper Lusatia

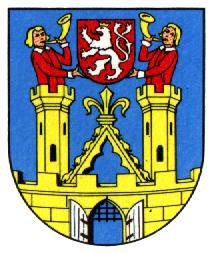
Bautzen	Görlitz	Kamenz
Lauban (Lubań)	Löbau	Zittau

The Lusatian League (Upper Sorbian: Łužiska liga) was a historical alliance of six towns in the region of Upper Lusatia from 1346 until 1815, when the region was controlled first by Bohemia (1346–1635) and later by the Electorate of Saxony (1635–1815). The member towns were Bautzen (Upper Sorbian: Budyšin), Görlitz (Zhorjelc), Kamenz (Kamjenc), Lauban (Lubań), Löbau (Lubij) and Zittau (Žitawa). Five of the towns are located in present-day Germany; Lubań and Zgorzelec (split from Görlitz after World War II) are within Poland.

The Lusatian League is known by the names Oberlausitzer Sechsstädtebund (German), Zwjazk šesćiměstow (Upper Sorbian), Šestiměstí (Czech) and Związek Sześciu Miast (Polish).

== Founding ==
In order to protect peace and order in Upper Lusatia, the six towns of Bautzen, Görlitz, Kamenz, Lauban, Löbau, and Zittau joined into a contract of protection on 21st August 1346. In its beginnings, the pact was chiefly intended to protect against knights-errant and other wandering warriors. Over the next centuries, the city union would influence the history of Upper Lusatia significantly, lasting longer than any other city union in Germany. The union of the cities caused a considerable increase in their political influence and visibility. It is possible that the founding of the union was helped by the Bohemian king Charles IV of Luxembourg, then ruler of the Holy Roman Empire as King of the Romans, as a counterbalance to the power of the landed gentry.

== Status of cities within the league ==
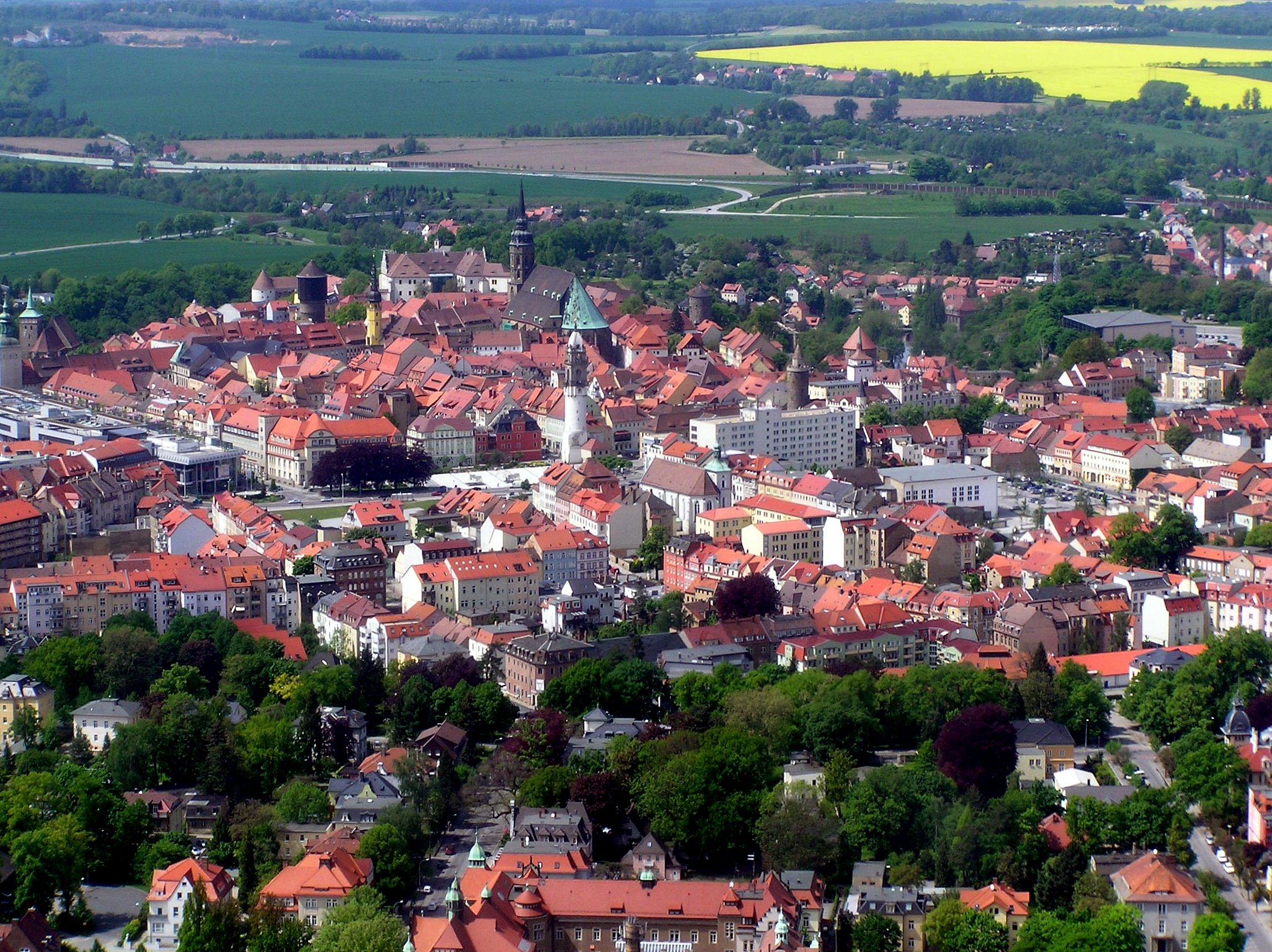
An aerial photo of Bautzen taken in spring.

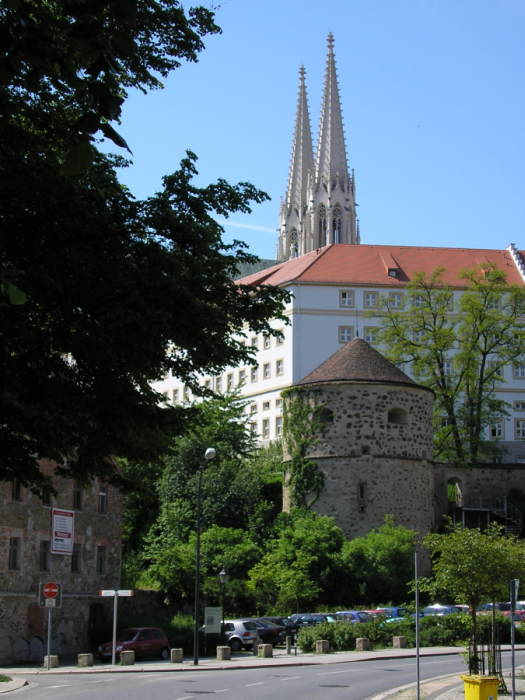
Church towers in Görlitz.

Unlike other civil arrangements in Upper Lusatia at the time, there was no dominant town in the league, although before the 12th century the town of Bautzen served as the ancestral seat of the Milceni, an ancient West Slavic tribe. Even though Bautzen served as the administrative center and was often called the capital of the league and Görlitz was for several centuries both the most populous and the economically strongest town, the differences between the individual towns were never so large that one town dominated the league outright. Even so, there was a nominal division of the league's six towns into "large towns", which were Bautzen, Görlitz, and Zittau, and "small towns", which included the other three towns of Kamenz, Lauban and Löbau. Still, in principle, all six towns within the league had equal standing.

Even so, there were internal conflicts within the league. Because Bautzen served as the administrative center and capital of the league, it had the first voice in the local council, as well as several other rights and privileges. Bautzen reserved signatory power for the league concerning legal documents, and reserved the right to open all of the league's official mail. Bautzen's other special privilege as administrative center was that it was the seat of the king's representative to the league, combining military, administrative, and royal power within the town. This caused conflicts with Görlitz, especially as Görlitz had quickly and unequivocally established itself as the economic center of the league. Görlitz achieved this position of economic superiority by being more easily reached by local traffic, and exploited the advantages it gained. As time went on, Görlitz exercised more and more power within the league, even as Bautzen remained the league's administrative center.

Meanwhile, in the beginning years of the league, Zittau also hosted a representative of the king, in addition to Bautzen. The city lost its representative in 1412. However, the power granted by hosting a royal representative made the town quite wealthy, so much so that at times, Zittau was the second wealthiest town in the league, pushing Bautzen down into third place within the league. The other three towns, Löbau, Lauban, and Kamenz were economically weaker, and therefore less interested in their place within the league. When there was conflict within the cities of the league, Kamenz sided more often with Bautzen, and Lauban with Görlitz, in accordance to their geographical locations. Löbau was the weakest city in terms of military or economic power, but it laid in the middle of the region, and conciliatory councils between Bautzen and Görlitz were often held there.

=== Nicknames ===
Because the cities remained united, despite economic competition with each other, this allowed the league to last a long time. Despite this, there were naturally still times of disagreement and discord within the league. In these times of disagreement, the cities had nicknames for each other's residents. The residents of Görlitz were referred to as "hat-turners," people from Zittau were called "cow-pushers," people from Bautzen were named "cat-snatchers," residents of Kamenz were called "snifflers," Lauban residents were labeled "onion-eaters," and the denizens of Löbau were named "cabbage-painters."

However, not all inter-town communication was negative. The towns had positive reputations as well. People from Zittau were referred to as educated, people from Görlitz were known to be honest, people from Bautzen were called well-meaning, Lauban residents were known for being industrious, and Löbau residents enjoyed a reputation for being good with money.

== History ==
The height of the league's power and influence occurred in its first 200 years of existence. In this time period, the league was the most powerful political force in Upper Lusatia, and was able to outstrip the local gentry in terms of power. In 1547, the fallout of the Schmalkald War, when the Holy Roman Emperor Ferdinand I fought against the Protestant Schmalkaldic League, weakened the Lusatian League considerably. The league of six towns sided with Schmalkald because as city leagues, they shared the same form of government. The emperor punished the league of six towns severely for this. Indeed, even though the towns were able to again consolidate their position, their political power was never as strong again.

=== Legal System ===
Primarily, the legal system in the league was in the hands of the king's representative to Upper Lusatia. He led a court named the "Voigtsding." There the gentry, farmers, and townspeople all appeared, although clergy were exempt to proceedings there. As time progressed, the league managed to have certain aspects of the legal system split. This was first accomplished by establishing a separate court for townspeople, and eventually a court for farmers within each municipal area. Knights and gentry could be tried in municipal courts as well. The courts also heard cases involving crimes which took place on country routes outside of the cities.

=== Breakup of the league ===
After the Congress of Vienna in 1815, Lusatia was partitioned. Görlitz and Lauban were ceded to the Kingdom of Prussia, ending the six town league after almost 500 years of existence. The remaining four cities remained in a "four-city league," but this ended in 1868.

== Second Founding ==
On June 21, 1991, the 770-year anniversary of the founding of Löbau, the league was revived. However, there were now seven cities, as the eastern part of Görlitz, on the east side of the Neisse River, became the stand-alone Polish city of Zgorzelec. The league no longer has any political power to speak of, and functions largely as a tourism promotion board.
