= Indonesian Bethel Church =

Group of Christian Pentecostal churches headquartered in Jakarta, Indonesia

Indonesian Bethel Church Gereja Bethel Indonesia
- Abbreviation: GBI
- Classification: Protestant
- Orientation: Pentecostal, Charismatic, Evangelical
- Polity: Episcopal Synodal
- Chairman: Rev. DR. Rubin Adi Abraham
- Region: Indonesia
- Headquarters: Ahmad Yani Street, Lots. 65, East Cempaka Putih, Cempaka Putih, Jakarta
- Founder: Rev. H.L. Senduk
- Origin: 1952; Sukabumi, Indonesia
- Congregations: 5,000
- Members: 3 million
- Official website: bppgbi.org

Indonesian Bethel Church or Bethel Full Gospel Church of God (Indonesian: Gereja Bethel Indonesia) abbreviated as GBI, is a group of Christian Pentecostal churches in Indonesia. It is a member of Church of God (Cleveland, Tennessee). The headquarters of the organisation is in Jakarta.

The name translates as Indonesia Bethel Church. It is also known as Bethel Full Gospel Church of God.

== History ==
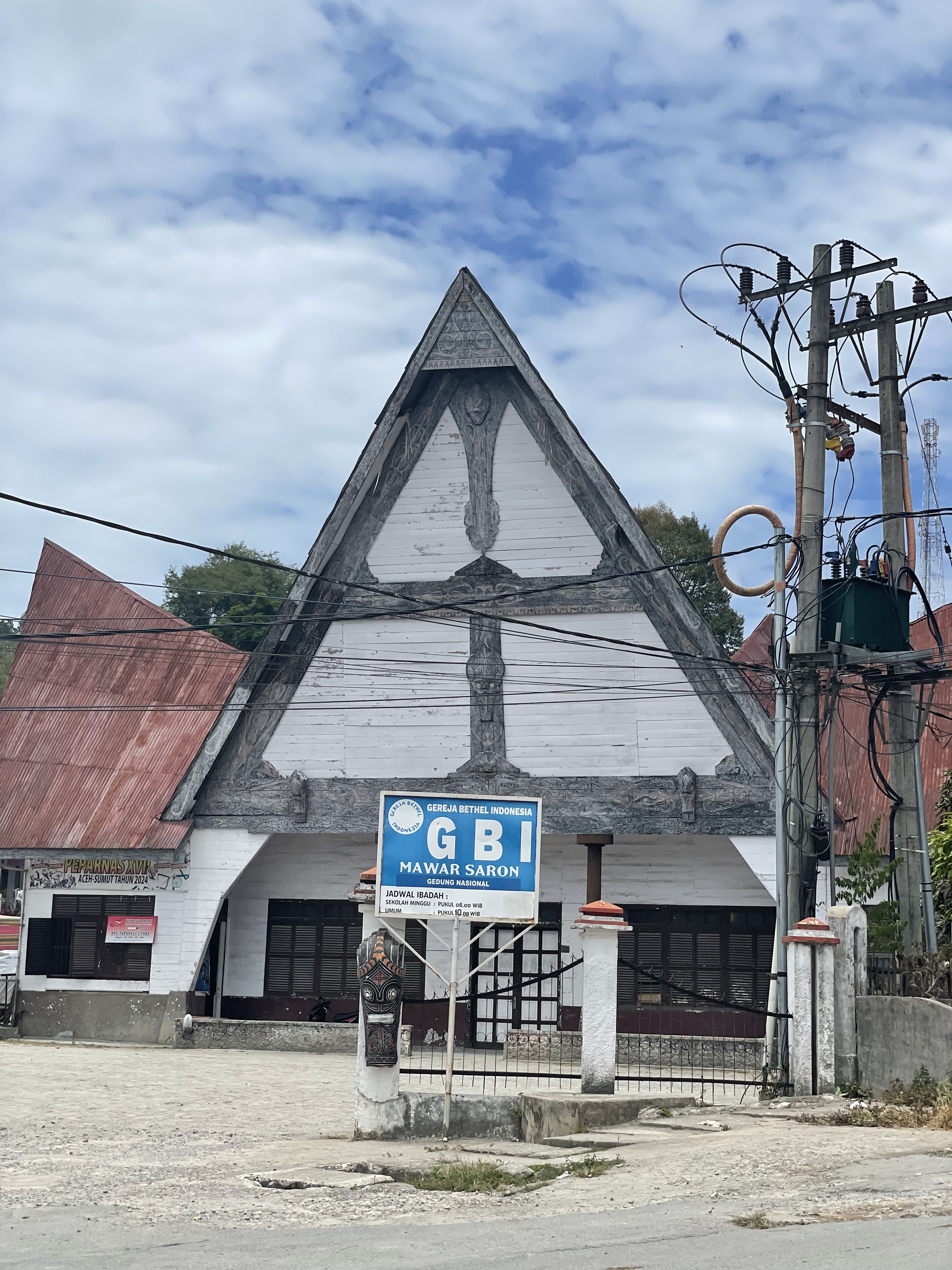
indonesian Bethel Church in Tarutung, North Sumatra

American missionaries brought Pentecostal doctrines to Indonesia in 1921. The Union of Pentecostal Churches was founded in 1924, later renamed to Pentecostal Church of Indonesia. In 1946, a group split from Pentecostal Church of Indonesia, founding Bethel Full Gospel Church. On 5 February 1967 Bethel Full Gospel Church signed a contract of unification with Church of God. However, on 6 October 1970, due to disagreements among the leaders of the church, the church was again re-registered under the name Bethel Church of Indonesia. Ministry of Religious Affairs officially registered the church under writ No. 41 of 9 December 1972.

In 1998, the church numbered 725 thousand believers in 1320 churches. By 2010, the number of believers increased to 2,5 million. Half of the members are Chinese people living in Indonesia.

In 2003, the Church inaugurates a 10,000-seat temple in Jakarta

In 2012, it would have 5,000 churches and 3 million members and 100,000 abroad.

== Creed ==
Gereja Bethel Indonesia is part of Pentecostalism.

The Confession of Faith contains statements of inspiration of the Bible, Trinity of God and Two Natures of Christ. Baptism and communion are ordinances. Particular emphasis is laid on baptism with the Holy Spirit and the practice of divine healing as a demonstration of the Resurrection Power of Christ.

Theological training of future ministers is conducted by Bethel Seminary, based in Jakarta, Kharisma school of theology and a number of other institutions.

== See also ==
- Church of God
- Protestantism in Indonesia
