= League of cities =

A league of cities or city league is a political, economic, or military alliance formed by multiple independent or autonomous cities. Historically, such leagues have emerged in various regions and eras to protect mutual interests, promote trade, and ensure collective defense against larger territorial powers or empires.

While the specific characteristics of these alliances varied globally, they typically flourished during periods of fragmented central authority. Prominent examples includes the alliances of city-states in ancient Greece, the influential Städtebünde of the Holy Roman Empire and medieval Italy, and alliances among autonomous cities during Japan's Sengoku period.

== Asia ==
=== Japan ===
- During Sengoku Period. The Hirano-Sakai Alliance. The autonomous merchant cities of Sakai and Hirano formed cooperative and defensive alliances to protect their trade and independence from regional warlords. Governed by wealthy merchant councils, these cities fortified themselves with defensive moats and maintained their autonomy until they were subjugated by Oda Nobunaga and Toyotomi Hideyoshi in the late 16th century.

== Europe ==
=== Holy Roman Empire ===
- 1167. The Lombard League was formed in 1167, supported by the Pope, to counter the attempts by the Hohenstaufen Holy Roman Emperors to assert influence over the Kingdom of Italy. At its apex, it included most of the cities of Northern Italy, but its membership changed with time. With the death of the third and last Hohenstaufen emperor, Frederick II, in 1250, it became obsolete and was disbanded.
- 1190. The Hanseatic League was a commercial and defensive confederation of merchant guilds and market towns in Northwestern and Central Europe. Growing from a few North German towns in the late 1100s, the league came to dominate Baltic maritime trade for three centuries along the coasts of Northern Europe. Hansa territories stretched from the Baltic to the North Sea and inland during the Late Middle Ages, and diminished slowly after 1450.
- 1197. The Tuscan League comprised the chief cities, barons and bishops of the Duchy of Tuscany, directed against the Holy Roman Emperor in alliance with the papacy. The original signatories were the communes of Lucca, Florence and Siena, the people living under the castles of Prato and San Miniato, and the bishopric of Volterra. They were later joined by the city of Arezzo.
- 1254. The First Rhenish League (Rheinischer Städtebund) existed only between 1254 and 1257. It comprised 59 cities.
- 1306. de:Thüringer Dreistädtebund - the Three City League of Thuringia, was an alliance of Erfurt, Nordhausen and Mühlhausen against the princely Wettin family of Saxony. It lasted from 1306 - 1481.
- 1346. The Lusatian League (German: Oberlausitzer Sechsstädtebund) was a league of six towns in the Bohemian (1346–1635), later Saxon (1635–1815) region of Upper Lusatia, that existed from 1346 until 1815. The member towns were Bautzen (Upper Sorbian: Budyšin), Görlitz (Zhorjelc), Kamenz (Kamjenc), Lauban (Lubań), Löbau (Lubij) and Zittau (Žitawa)
- 1354. The Décapole (Dekapolis or German: Zehnstädtebund) was an alliance formed in 1354 by ten Imperial cities of the Holy Roman Empire in the Alsace region to maintain their rights. It was disbanded in 1679.
- 1367. The Confederation of Cologne was a military alliance against Denmark signed 1367 by cities of the Hanseatic League on their meeting called Hansetag in Cologne.
- 1376. Swabian League of Cities
- 1381. A Second Rhenish League and a first Swabian League were formed in 1381, merging into the South German League (Süddeutscher Städtebund) still in the same year. The League was a military defense pact against the nobility. Peace was made in the Treaty of Heidelberg on 26 July 1384.
- 1397. Lizard Union was an organization of Prussian nobles and knights.
- 1412. Pentapolitana was a 15th-century alliance of the five most important Hungarian royal free cities (now eastern Slovakia): Kassa (today Košice), Bártfa (Bardejov), Lőcse (Levoča), Eperjes (Prešov), and Kisszeben (Sabinov).
- 1440. The Prussian Confederation (German: Preußischer Bund) was formed on 21 February 1440 at Marienwerder by a group of 53 nobles and clergy and 19 cities in Prussia, to oppose the Teutonic Knights. It was based on the basis of an earlier similar organization, the Lizard Union established in 1397 by Chełmno Land nobles.
- 1454. Italic League
- 1471. Three Leagues was the alliance leading eventually to the formation of the Swiss canton of Grisons.
  - Grey League
  - League of God's House
  - League of the Ten Jurisdictions
- 1488. The Swabian League (Schwäbischer Bund) was a mutual defence and peace keeping association of Imperial Estates – free Imperial cities, prelates, principalities and knights – principally in the territory of the early medieval stem duchy of Swabia, established in 1488 at the behest of Emperor Frederick III of Habsburg and supported as well by Bertold von Henneberg-Römhild, archbishop of Mainz, whose conciliar rather than monarchic view of the Reich often put him at odds with Frederick's successor Maximilian. The Swabian League cooperated towards the keeping of the imperial peace and at least in the beginning curbing the expansionist Bavarian dukes from the House of Wittelsbach and the revolutionary threat from the south in the form of the Swiss. The League held regular meetings, supported tribunals and maintained a unified force of 12,000 infantrymen and 1200 cavalry.

== See also ==
- Medieval commune
- Free imperial city
- Covenant of Mayors

== Bibliography ==
- "Alexander [pausen] § Alexander III". Encarta Encyclopedie Winkler Prins (in Dutch). Microsoft Corporation/Het Spectrum. 2002.
