= Eliya XII =

Mar Eliya XII
- Patriarch of the Church of the East
- Church: Church of the East
- Installed: 1778
- Term ended: 1804
- Predecessor: Eliya XI
- Successor: Shimun XVI Yohannan (as the Patriarch of Assyrian Church of the East); Yohannan VIII Hormizd (as Patriarch belonging to the Elia line based in the Monastery of Rabban Hormizd)

Personal details
- Died: 1804
- Residence: Rabban Hormizd Monastery

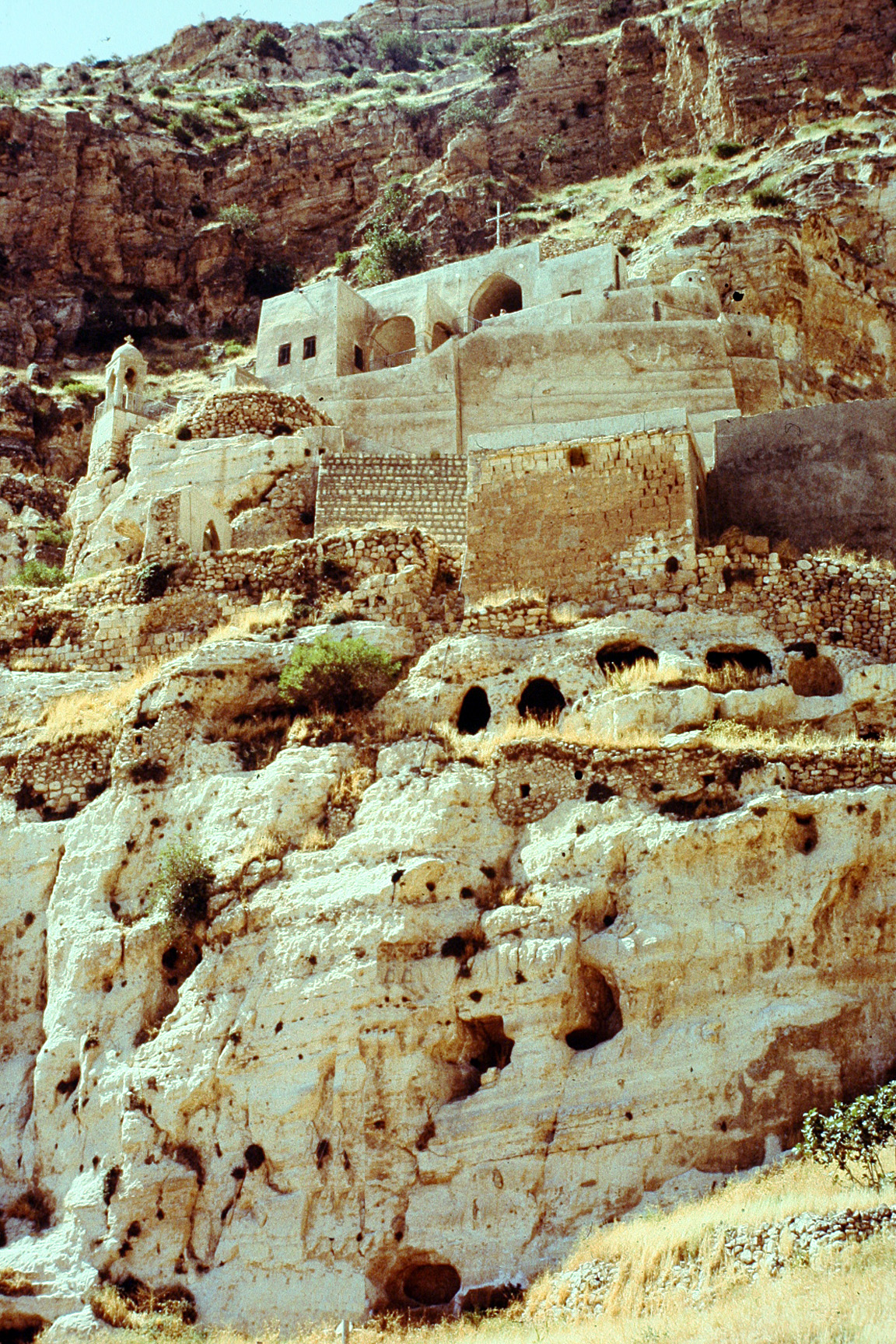
The ancient Rabban Hormizd Monastery, former residence of the Patriarchs of the Church of the East

Eliya XII (Syriac: ܐܠܝܐ / Elīyā, d. 1804) was Patriarch of the Church of the East, from 1778 to 1804, with formal residence in Rabban Hormizd Monastery, near Alqosh, in modern Iraq. His birth name was Ishoyahb, and he was the elder son of priest Abraham, who was brother of the previous patriarch Eliya XI (1722-1778). In 1744, Ishoyahb was consecrated as metropolitan, and designated as presumptive successor (natar kursya) by his paternal uncle, patriarch Eliya XI, who died in 1778, and Ishoyahb succeeded him, as patriarch Eliya XII. His tenure was marked by a prolonged rivalry with his pro-Catholic cousin Yohannan Hormizd, who also claimed the patriarchal throne. In 1804, Eliya XII died and was buried in the Rabban Hormizd Monastery, as the last patriarch of the senior Eliya line.

In older historiography, he was designated as Eliya XII, but later renumbered as Eliya "XIII" by some authors. After the resolution of several chronological questions, he was designated again as Eliya XII, and that numeration is generally accepted in recent scholarly works, with some exceptions.

== Biography ==
Predesignated for the ecclesiastical career, as nephew of patriarch Eliya XI, he was appointed metropolitan in 1744, and became presumptive successor (natar kursya) of the patriarchal throne. His initial name was Ishoyahb (Īshō'yahb), but upon assuming the patriarchal throne in 1778 he took the traditional name Eliya. His cousin and long-time rival Yohannan Hormizd later claimed that in the spring of 1776, patriarch Eliya XI dismissed Ishoyahb and appointed him (Yohannan) as metropolitan and designated successor, but later scholarly research of primary sources, including those from 1777, showed that Ishoyahb was still serving as metropolitan and patriarchal successor.

As the new patriarch, since 1778, Eliya XII was faced with several complex problems, inherited from his predecessors. Long rivalry between two coexisting traditionalist patriarchal branches, the senior Eliya line of Alqosh and the junior Shimun line of Qochanis, represented a major obstacle for the consolidation of the Church of the East. Both patriarchs, Eliya XII of the senior line, and his rival Shimun XVI of the junior line, had their own hierarchies, that continued to assert their separate jurisdictions over the same flock, thus prolonging internal divisions. In the same time, both sides were faced with additional challenges, caused by the ever-worsening position of local Christian communities in frontier war-torn regions between two mighty empires (Ottoman and Persian).

In order to overcome the division between two traditionalist patriarchal lines, one side had to make concessions. Already in 1784, Eliya XII appointed his nephew Hananisho (d. 1813) as metropolitan of Amadiya, thus intending to secure the future patriarchal succession in his family. During the following years, metropolitan Hananisho demonstrated some pro-Catholic tendencies, but they were not accepted as sincere by Rome, thus leading Hananisho to take the opposite, contra-Catholic stance.

By the end of the patriarchal tenure of Eliya XII, the question of succession remained unresolved. He died in 1804, and was buried in the Rabban Hormizd Monastery. His branch decided not to elect a new patriarch, thus breaking the long-standing practice, and eventually enabling the patriarch Shimun XVI Yohannan (1780–1820) of the junior line to become the sole primate of the entire traditionalist community.

During his tenure, Eliya XII was faced with additional challenges, represented by a growing pro-Catholic movement. In 1780, a group seceded from his jurisdiction and elected his young cousin Yohannan Hormizd (b. 1760) as their leader. That group entered into communion with the Catholic Church. In 1783, Yohannan Hormizd was appointed by Rome as new Eastern-Catholic Archbishop of Mosul and patriarchal administrator of the Chaldean Catholic Church. Learning of the death of Eliya XII in 1804, pro-Catholic parties aimed to take over the ancient Rabban Hormizd Monastery, and eventually succeeded, firstly in 1808, and finally in 1813, thus asserting Eastern-Catholic jurisdiction over that ancient monastic institution, that was the main patriarchal residence since the 15th century.

== See also ==
- Patriarch of the Church of the East
- List of Patriarchs of the Church of the East
- List of Patriarchs of the Assyrian Church of the East
- Assyrian Church of the East

== Sources ==
- Badger, George Percy (1852). The Nestorians and Their Rituals. Vol. 1. London: Joseph Masters.
- Baum, Wilhelm; Winkler, Dietmar W. (2000). Die Apostolische Kirche des Ostens: Geschichte der sogenannten Nestorianer. Klagenfurt: Kitab.
- Baum, Wilhelm; Winkler, Dietmar W. (2003). The Church of the East: A Concise History. London-New York: Routledge-Curzon.
- Baum, Wilhelm (2004). "Die sogenannten Nestorianer im Zeitalter der Osmanen (15. bis 19. Jahrhundert)". Zwischen Euphrat und Tigris: Österreichische Forschungen zum Alten Orient. Münster-Wien: LIT Verlag. pp. 229–246.
- Baumer, Christoph (2005). Frühes Christentum zwischen Euphrat und Jangtse: Eine Zeitreise entlang der Seidenstraße zur Kirche des Ostens. Stuttgart: Urachhaus.
- Baumer, Christoph (2006). The Church of the East: An Illustrated History of Assyrian Christianity. London-New York: Tauris.
- Burleson, Samuel; Rompay, Lucas van (2011). "List of Patriarchs of the Main Syriac Churches in the Middle East". Gorgias Encyclopedic Dictionary of the Syriac Heritage. Piscataway, NJ: Gorgias Press. pp. 481–491.
- Ebied, Rifaat (1972). "Some Syriac Manuscripts from the Collection of Sir E. A. Wallis Budge". Symposium Syriacum, 1972. Roma: Pontificium Institutum Orientalium Studiorum. pp. 509–539.
- Fiey, Jean Maurice (1993). Pour un Oriens Christianus Novus: Répertoire des diocèses syriaques orientaux et occidentaux. Beirut: Orient-Institut.
- Hage, Wolfgang (2007). Das orientalische Christentum. Stuttgart: Kohlhammer Verlag.
- Harrak, Amir (2003). "Patriarchal Funerary Inscriptions in the Monastery of Rabban Hormizd: Types, Literary Origins, and Purpose" (PDF). Hugoye: Journal of Syriac Studies. 6 (2): 235–264.
- Hartmann, Klaus-Peter (1980). Untersuchungen zur Sozialgeographie christlicher Minderheiten im Vorderen Orient. Wiesbaden: Reichert.
- Jakob, Joachim (2014). Ostsyrische Christen und Kurden im Osmanischen Reich des 19. und frühen 20. Jahrhunderts. Münster: LIT Verlag.
- Lampart, Albert (1966). Ein Märtyrer der Union mit Rom: Joseph I. 1681-1696, Patriarch der Chaldäer. Köln: Benziger Verlag.
- Macomber, William F. (1969). "A Funeral Madraša on the Assassination of Mar Hnanišo". Mémorial Mgr Gabriel Khouri-Sarkis (1898-1968). Louvain: Imprimerie orientaliste. pp. 263–273.
- Malech, George D.; Malech, Nestorius G. (1910). History of the Syrian nation and the Old Evangelical-Apostolic Church of the East: From Remote Antiquity to the Present Time. Minneapolis: Author's edition.
- Murre van den Berg, Heleen (1999a). "The Patriarchs of the Church of the East from the Fifteenth to Eighteenth Centuries" (PDF). Hugoye: Journal of Syriac Studies. 2 (2): 235–264. doi:10.31826/hug-2010-020119. S2CID 212688640.
- Murre van den Berg, Heleen (1999b). From a Spoken to a Written Language: The Introduction and Development of Literary Urmia Aramaic in the Nineteenth Century. Leiden: Nederlands Instituut voor het Nabije Oosten.
- Murre van den Berg, Heleen (2006). "A Neo-Aramaic Gospel Lectionary Translation by Israel of Alqosh". Loquentes linguis: Linguistic and Oriental Studies in Honour of Fabrizio A. Pennacchietti. Wiesbaden: Otto Harrassowitz Verlag. pp. 523–533.
- Murre van den Berg, Heleen (2008). "Classical Syriac, Neo-Aramaic, and Arabic in the Church of the East and the Chaldean Church between 1500 and 1800". Aramaic in Its Historical and Linguistic Setting. Wiesbaden: Harrassowitz Verlag. pp. 335–352.
- Spuler, Bertold (1961). "Die nestorianische Kirche". Religionsgeschichte des Orients in der Zeit der Weltreligionen. Leiden: Brill. pp. 120–169.
- Tisserant, Eugène (1931). "L'Église nestorienne". Dictionnaire de théologie catholique. Vol. 11. Paris: Letouzey et Ané. pp. 157–323.
- Vosté, Jacques Marie (1930). "Les inscriptions de Rabban Hormizd et de N.-D. des Semences près d'Alqoš (Iraq)". Le Muséon. 43: 263–316.
- Vosté, Jacques Marie (1939). "Catalogue des manuscrits syro-chaldéens conservés dans la bibliothèque épiscopale de 'Aqra (Iraq)". Orientalia Christiana Periodica. 5: 368–406.
- Wilmshurst, David (2000). The Ecclesiastical Organisation of the Church of the East, 1318–1913. Louvain: Peeters Publishers.
- Wilmshurst, David (2011). The Martyred Church: A History of the Church of the East. London: East & West Publishing Limited.
- Wilmshurst, David (2019). "The patriarchs of the Church of the East". The Syriac World. London: Routledge. pp. 799–805.

Church of the East titles
Preceded by Eliya XI (1722–1778)	Catholicos-Patriarch of the Church of the East; Eliya line (Alqosh) (1778–1804)	Succeeded by Line Ended; Shimun XVI Yohannan left as sole Catholicos-Patriarch of the Church of the East
Preceded by Eliya XI (1722–1778)	Catholicos-Patriarch of the Church of the East; 1804 – 1820	Succeeded by Shimun XVI Yohannan
