= Leonard Stöckel =

Slovak educator and theologian (1510–1560)

Leonard Stöckel (also spelled as Stöckl or Stöckelius, Hungarian: Stöckel Lénárd; 1510–1560) was a Lutheran teacher, theologian, writer, humanist and an influential reformer.

== Early life and education ==
Stöckel was born in 1510 in the royal free city of Bártfa (Bardejov), where his father worked as a blacksmith and also served in the city council. He began his studies in his hometown under the guidance of Valentin Eck, himself a follower of renaissance humanist Erasmus of Rotterdam. Subsequently, he was sent to Kassa (Košice) where Leonard Cox taught that time.

In 1530 Stöckel enrolled at the University of Wittenberg and became a student of Martin Luther and Philipp Melanchthon. During his stay in Wittenberg, Stöckel developed close ties with both of them and he also worked as a private tutor in Luther's birth town Eisleben (1533–1536). Stöckel remained in Saxony until 1539, when he returned to Kingdom of Hungary and became the rector of the school in his hometown Bártfa.

== Reformation in Hungary ==
Stöckel immediately re-organized the school system in evangelical spirit and in 1540 he introduced new school laws (Leges scholae Bartphensis). His actions soon lifted the school to the level of those excellent German ones and attracted students from far and wide.

Stöckel's return also saw the influence and reach of Lutheran ideas in Upper Hungary to grow significantly. He became an influential reformer, reached an agreement between the five most important royal free cities in Upper Hungary, the so-called Pentapolitana, and won them for the Reformation. Based on the Augsburg Confession of Melanchthon (1530), Stöckel wrote his own Lutheran confession, the Confessio Pentapolitana, that was adopted by the Pentapolitana members in July 1549. The Confessio Pentapolitana was recognized by King Ferdinand I in 1549 and confirmed again in 1558. In 1560 it was recognized as the only creed on behalf of the Roman Catholic Church by Nicolaus Olahus, Primate of Hungary too.

== Works ==
- Leges scholae Bartphensis (1540)
- Apologia Ecclesiae Bartphensis (1558)
- Cittum nempe Cassoviensis, Leutschoviensis, Eperiessiensis, Bartphensis, Cibiniensis (Bártfa, 1560)
- Annotationes locorum communium doctrinae christianae Philippi Melanchtonis (Basel, 1561)
- Opus de Antichristo; Formulae tractandarum sacrarum concionum (Bártfa, 1578)
- Postilla, sive enarrationes erotomaticae Epistolarum et Evangeliorum anniversariorum (Bártfa, 1596)
