= Rakovo, Slovakia =

Rakovo
- Municipality
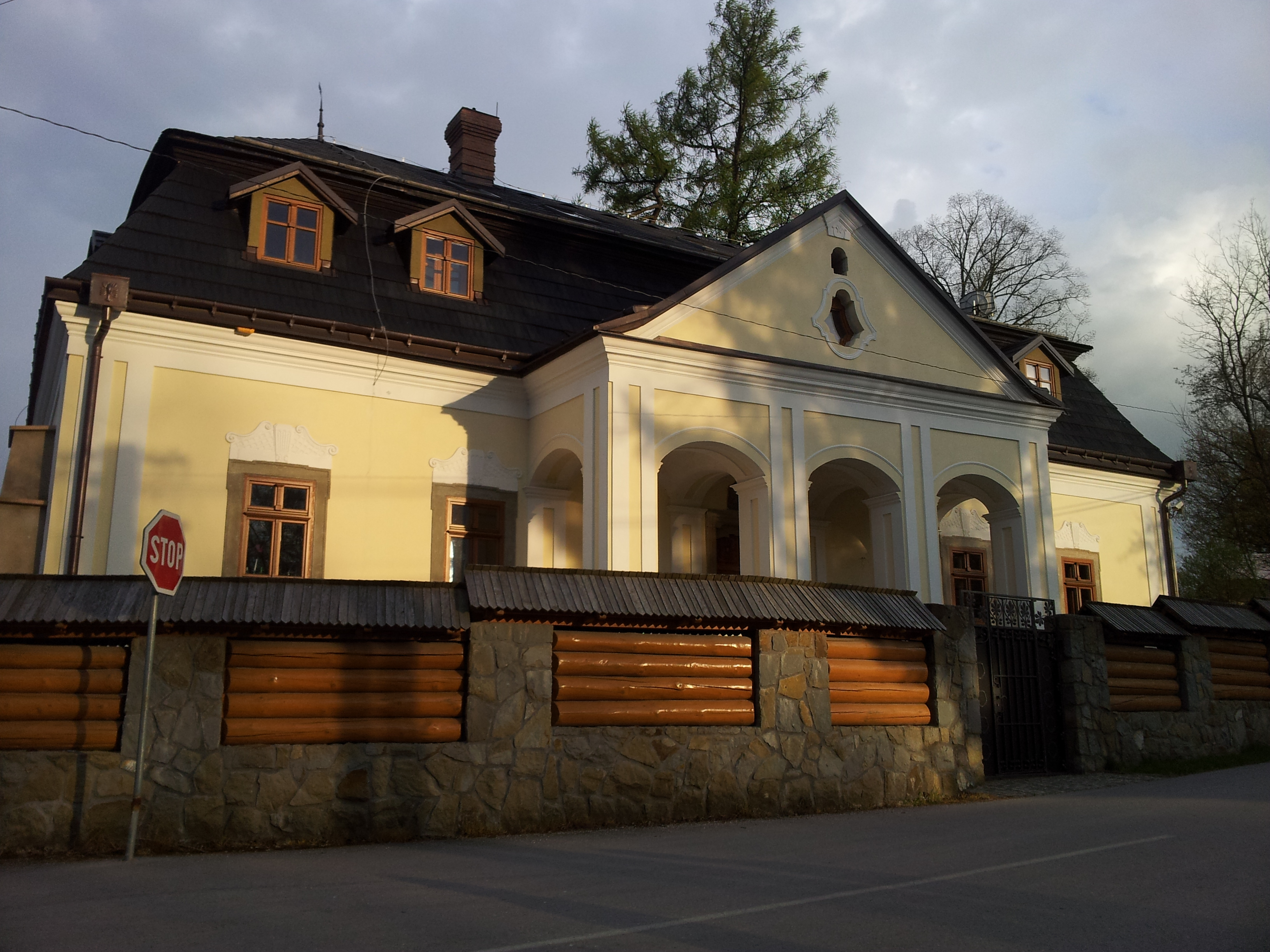

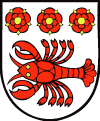
- Flag Coat of arms

- Location of Rakovo in the Žilina Region Location of Rakovo in Slovakia
- Coordinates: 48.99°N 18.88°E
- Country: Slovakia
- Region: Žilina Region
- District: Martin District
- First mentioned: 1230

Area
  - Total: 5.41 km^{2} (2.09 sq mi)
- Elevation: 432 m (1,417 ft)

Population (2025)
  - Total: 422
- Time zone: UTC+1 (CET)
  - Summer (DST): UTC+2 (CEST)
- Postal code: 384 2
- Area code: +421 43
- Vehicle registration plate (until 2022): MT
- Website: rakovo.sk

Rakovo (Hungarian: Nagyrákó) is a village and municipality in Martin District in the Žilina Region of northern Slovakia.

== History ==
In historical records, the village was first mentioned in 1230. Before the establishment of independent Czechoslovakia in 1918, it was part of Turóc County within the Kingdom of Hungary. From 1939 to 1945, it was part of the Slovak Republic.

== Geography ==
The municipality lies at an altitude of 432 metres (1,417 ft) and covers an area of 5.41 km^{2} (2.09 sq mi) (2025).

== Population ==
Population statistic (10 years)
Year	1995	2005	2015	2025
Count	239	323	354	422
Difference		+35.14%	+9.59%	+19.20%

Population statistic
Year	2024	2025
Count	398	422
Difference		+6.03%

It has a population of 422 people (31 December 2025).

=== Ethnicity ===
Census 2021 (1+ %)
Ethnicity	Number	Fraction
Slovak	369	96.85%
Not found out	15	3.93%
Russian	4	1.04%
Total	381	

In year 2021 was 381 people by ethnicity 369 as Slovak, 15 as Not found out, 4 as Russian and 2 as Czech.

Note on population: The difference values of population numbers in the table "Population statistic" and in the sections "Ethnicity" & "Religion" is caused by the use of various statistical methods.

=== Religion ===
Census 2021 (1+ %)
Religion	Number	Fraction
Roman Catholic Church	145	38.06%
None	130	34.12%
Evangelical Church	90	23.62%
Not found out	8	2.1%
Total	381	

In year 2021 was 381 people by religion 145 from Roman Catholic Church, 130 from None, 90 from Evangelical Church, 8 from Not found out, 3 from Other, 2 from Greek Catholic Church, 1 from Other and not ascertained christian church, 1 from Christian Congregations in Slovakia and 1 from United Methodist Church.
