= Pentapolitana =

Coordinates: 49°00′N 20°36′E

Pentapolitana (or rarely Pentapolis) was a league of towns in the Middle Ages of the five most important Hungarian royal free cities (Latin: libera regiae civitas, Hungarian: szabad királyi város, German: Königliche Freistadt; Slovak: slobodné kráľovské mesto) of the Kingdom of Hungary; Kassa (today Košice), Bártfa (Bardejov), Lőcse (Levoča), Eperjes (Prešov), and Kisszeben (Sabinov). The cities are currently in eastern Slovakia.

The first meeting of the representatives of the towns in question took place in 1412. The actual alliance arose between 1440 and 1445.

The main role of the Pentapolitana was to control and to develop trade as there were important ancient trade routes in the region of the north-eastern part of the Kingdom of Hungary, present-day eastern Slovakia. The leading town of the Pentapolitana was Košice.

In 1549, i.e. during the Reformation period, the Pentapolitana created its own Lutheran confession, the Confessio Pentapolitana.
