= Athanasius III Dabbas =

Melkite Patriarch of Antioch

- Melkite Patriarch of Antioch
- Church: Melkite Church
- See: Patriarch of Antioch
- Term ended: 5 August 1724
- Predecessor: Cyril V Zaim
- Successor: Sylvester of Antioch (Orthodox); Cyril VI Tanas (Melkite)

Orders
- Consecration: 5 July 1685 (bishop) by Leonce of Saidnaya

Personal details
- Born: Paul Dabbas; 1647 Damascus
- Died: 5 August 1724 (aged 76–77) Aleppo

Patriarch Athanasius III Dabbas (1647–1724), sometimes known also as Athanasius IV, was the last Patriarch of Antioch before the final split of 1724 which divided the Melkite Church between the Melkite Greek Catholic Church and the Greek Orthodox Church of Antioch. He was shortly, from 1705 to 1707, also regent Archbishop of Cyprus, where he is known as Athanasios II.

== Life ==
Boulos (Paul) Dabbas was born in Damascus in 1647 and studied under the Jesuits. His parents were Fadlallah Debbas (1620-1706), a priest, and Mariam Tarazi. He was the first of 6 sons. He entered in the Mar Saba monastery where at his priestly ordination he took the name of Procopius. Later he was appointed superior of a monastery in Bethlehem. He later moved to Syria and tried to be appointed bishop of Aleppo, but without success.

The situation of the hierarchy of the Melkite Church was actually unstable in such a time. After the death of Patriarch Macarios III Zaim in 1672, the patriarchal throne was disputed between his nephew, Constantine Zaim, who was elected Patriarch at the age of 20 (or less) under the name of Cyril V Zaim, and Neophytos of Chios, nephew of previous Patriarch Euthymius III of Chios and appointed to such position by the Ecumenical Patriarch Dionysius IV of Constantinople. In 1682 Neophytos of Chios, because of his debts, decided to retire, leaving Cyril V Zaim as the only claimant. This situation lasted not for long: the next contender of the patriarchal throne was actually Paul Dabbas, supported by the Franciscan friars (who opposed Cyril Zaim, charged of simony) and by his maternal uncle Michael Khayat, very influential with the Sublime Porte. In 1685 Michael Khayat succeeded to get from the Ottoman Empire a firman that appointed Paul Dabbas as Patriarch of the Melkite Church. Thus on July 5, 1685 Paul Dabbas was consecrated bishop by Leonce of Saidnaya and other two bishops, and he was enthroned as Patriarch with the name of Athanasius III. The next nine years were marked by the conflict between him and the previous claiming Patriarch, Cyril V Zaim.

On April 10, 1687, Athanasius III Dabbas made a Roman Catholic profession of faith, and subsequently on June 16 of the same year the Roman Congregation for the Propagation of the Faith confirmed his Patriarchal election. The congratulations of Pope Innocent XI followed on August 10. Since this date the Vatican considered him as the legitimate Patriarch of the Melkite Church.

The fight with Cyril V Zaim ended in October 1694 when the two rivals came to an agreement after the arbitration of Salmon, an Aleppian Jew. The terms of the agreement were: Athanasius recognized Cyril as Patriarch in change of 13,000 Écus, the appointment to the See of Aleppo and the right to succession at Cyril's death. This agreement was judged in 1698 null by the Vatican, which continued to consider Athanasius as Patriarch. From 1700 to 1704 Athanasius Dabbas traveled in Eastern Europe to beg for financial help. He visited in particular the Wallachia where he got the support of Prince Constantin Brâncoveanu. At end 1705 Patriarch Gabriel III of Constantinople had him elected as regent (proedros) Archbishop of Cyprus, an office Athanasius kept till early 1707. When back to Aleppo, with the help of Abdallah Zakher he established a printing press.

In 1716 the reigning Patriarch Cyril V Zaim made he too a Roman Catholic profession of faith and was received in communion with Rome on May 9, 1718. After Cyril's decision, Athanasius declared himself Orthodox, leading the Orthodox party to which he remained faithful to his own death.

On 16 January 1720 Cyril V Zaim died and, after a try of the Ecumenical Patriarch of Constantinople to appoint an own bishop as Patriarch, Athanasius was finally proclaimed Patriarch of Antioch, winning also over the candidature, in Damascus, of the pro-Catholic Euthymios Saifi, a friend of Cyril Zaim. During his four years of patriarchate, he preferred to live in Aleppo rather than in Damascus where there was the Patriarchal See. He died in Aleppo on 13 July 1724. Following his death, there wouldn’t be another ethnically Arab Patriarch of Antioch until Meletius II in 1899.

Athanasius Dabbas’ succession laid bare the divisions in the Melkite Church: between the pro-Catholic and the pro-Orthodox parties, and also between the communities of Damascus (that supported Cyril V Zaim) and of the Aleppo (tied to Athanasius). Athanasius Dabbas on his deathbed chosen as his own successor the priest Sylvester (1696–1766), a fierce supporter of the Aleppine Orthodox party, while the Melkite community in Damascus proceeded with the formal election of the new Patriarch and elected the pro-Catholic Cyril VI Tanas. Later, the Patriarch Jeremias III of Constantinople declared Cyril's election to be invalid, excommunicated him, and appointed Sylvester to the patriarchal See of Antioch, consecrating him bishop in Istanbul. This division marked the split between the Greek Orthodox Church of Antioch and the Melkite Greek Catholic Church.

== Works ==
Athanasius Dabbas was a prolific writer and publisher. His masterwork, History of the Patriarchate of Antioch from Saint Peter to 1202 was written in Greek and translated also in Latin. He edited and published also liturgical texts, as a Liturgicon in 1701 (which was used by Melkite Greek Catholic Church till 1839) and an Horologion in 1702.

== See also ==
- Patriarch of Antioch
- List of Greek Orthodox Patriarchs of Antioch
- List of Melkite Greek Catholic Patriarchs of Antioch
- Church of Cyprus
- List of archbishops of Cyprus

== Notes ==
Preceded by Cyril V Zaim	Melkite Patriarch of Antioch; 1707-1724	Succeeded by Cyril VI Tanas
