= Euthymius Fadel =

- Bishop of Zahle and Forzol
- Church: Melkite Greek Catholic Church
- Appointed: 1724
- Term ended: 1775

Orders
- Consecration: 1724 (Bishop) by Neophytos Nasri

Personal details
- Born: Ma'loula
- Died: 1776

Euthymius Fadel of Ma’loula (died 1776) was bishop of Zahle and Forzol of the Melkite Greek Catholic Church and took a preeminent part in the 1724 split of the Melkite Church.

== Life ==
Euthymius Fadel was born in Ma'loula, Syria and he entered in the Basilian Salvatorian Order. On September 25 1724 he was consecrated Bishop by the pro-Catholic bishop of Saidnaya, Neophytos Nasri, and the following week, on October 1, 1724 he co-consecrated Cyril VI Tanas as bishop and Patriarch of the Melkite Church, so originating the split of the Melkite Church.

He lived later in his diocese, but after persecutions from the Orthodox party, he had to move to Basilian Monastery of the Holy Saviour at Joun near Saida, Lebanon, where, as most of the Basilian monks, he became a partisan of Athanasius Jawhar in the clashes with Patriarch Theodosius V Dahan which signed the history of the Melkite Church in the 18th century. In this frame, a few days after 23 December 1763 he consecrated as bishop the future patriarch Cyril VII Siaj. This consecration was considered illegal and he was suspended from his functions till the appeasement in 1768. In 1775 he resigned as bishop of Zahle and Forzol, and he died in 1776.
