= Patriarch Cyril =

Patriarch Cyril may refer to:

- Patriarch Cyril I of Alexandria (ruled in 412–444)
- Cyril Lucaris (1572–1638)
- Patriarch Cyril of Constantinople (disambiguation) (seven Patriarchs from 1612 to 1860)
- Cyril of Bulgaria (ruled in 1901–1971)
- Cyril I of Moscow and All Russia, since 2009
- Patriarch Cyril II of Jerusalem, (ruled (1846–1872)
- Pope Cyril II of Alexandria (ruled 1078–1092)
- Patriarch Cyril II of Alexandria, Greek Patriarch of Alexandria in the 12th century
- Patriarch Cyril II of Jerusalem (ruled in 1846–1872)
- Cyril III of Alexandria, Greek Patriarch of Alexandria in 1601–1620
- Patriarch Cyril V Zaim (died 1720)
- Cyril VI Tanas (1680–1760), Patriarch of the Melkite Greek Catholic Church
- Pope Cyril VI of Alexandria (1902–1971), Pope and Patriarch of the Coptic Orthodox Church of Alexandria
- Cyril VII Siaj (died 1796), Patriarch of the Melkite Greek Catholic Church (ruled 1794–1796)
- Cyril VIII Jaha, Patriarch of the Melkite Greek Catholic Church (ruled 1902–1916)
- Cyril IX Moghabghab (1855–1947), Patriarch of the Melkite Greek Catholic Church (ruled 1925–1947)

== See also ==
- Patriarch Kirilo (disambiguation)
