= Maximos II Hakim =

Head of the Melkite Greek Catholic Church from 1760 to 1761

- Patriarch of Antioch
- Church: Melkite Greek Catholic Church
- See: Patriarch of Antioch
- Installed: 1 August 1760
- Term ended: 15 November 1761
- Predecessor: Cyril VI Tanas
- Successor: Theodosius V Dahan

Orders
- Consecration: 1732 (Bishop) by Gerosimos, bishop of Aleppo

Personal details
- Born: Maximos Hakim c. 1689
- Died: 15 November 1761 (aged 71–72)

Maximos II Hakim was Patriarch of the Melkite Greek Catholic Church from 1760 to 1761.

== Life ==
Maximos Hakim was born in Aleppo, circa 1689. He was a member of the Basilian Chouerite Order, of which he became general superior on November 29, 1729. In 1732, he was elected as metropolitan of Aleppo for both the Melkite Catholic and Melkite Orthodox parties; he was consecrated in this position by Gerosimos, former bishop of Aleppo and one of the founders of the Basilian Chouerite Order. This situation could not last, given the recent division within the Church, and when in 1750 the Patriarchate of Constantinople appointed—also in Aleppo—a new Orthodox bishop, the hierarchy was definitively split, with Maximos remaining the bishop for only the Melkite Catholics. Due to this situation, he was long forced to live within the safety of his order's motherhouse in Lebanon.

In 1759, patriarch Cyril VI Tanas appointed his nephew Athanasius Jawhar as his successor, and died, shortly afterward, in January 1760. Although Athanasius' election was supported by the bishops of the Basilian Salvatorian Order (both Cyril VI and Athanasius were Salvatorians), the Basilian Chouerite bishops contested this, pointing out that Athanasius was not of the legal age to be appointed bishop. Rome—unaware that appointing a nephew was a common use in the Melkite Church, before the two churches were unified—did not confirm Athanasius' election, and, on August 1, 1760, appointed Maximos Hakim as Patriarch.

The Apostolic Legate Dominique Lanza arrived in Lebanon to carry the news only in June 1761, and on July 23, 1761, he summoned a synod of the Melkite bishops to formalize the election of Maximos II Hakim, who was already ill. Maximos II Hakim died shortly later, on November 15, 1761.
