= Melkite Patriarchate =

Melkite Patriarchate may refer to:

- Melkite Catholic Patriarchate of Antioch
- historically, any of the Greek Orthodox patriarchates of the East:
  - Greek Orthodox Patriarchate of Alexandria
  - Greek Orthodox Patriarchate of Antioch
  - Greek Orthodox Patriarchate of Jerusalem

== See also ==
- Melkite
