= Church of Antioch =

Ancient Christian church

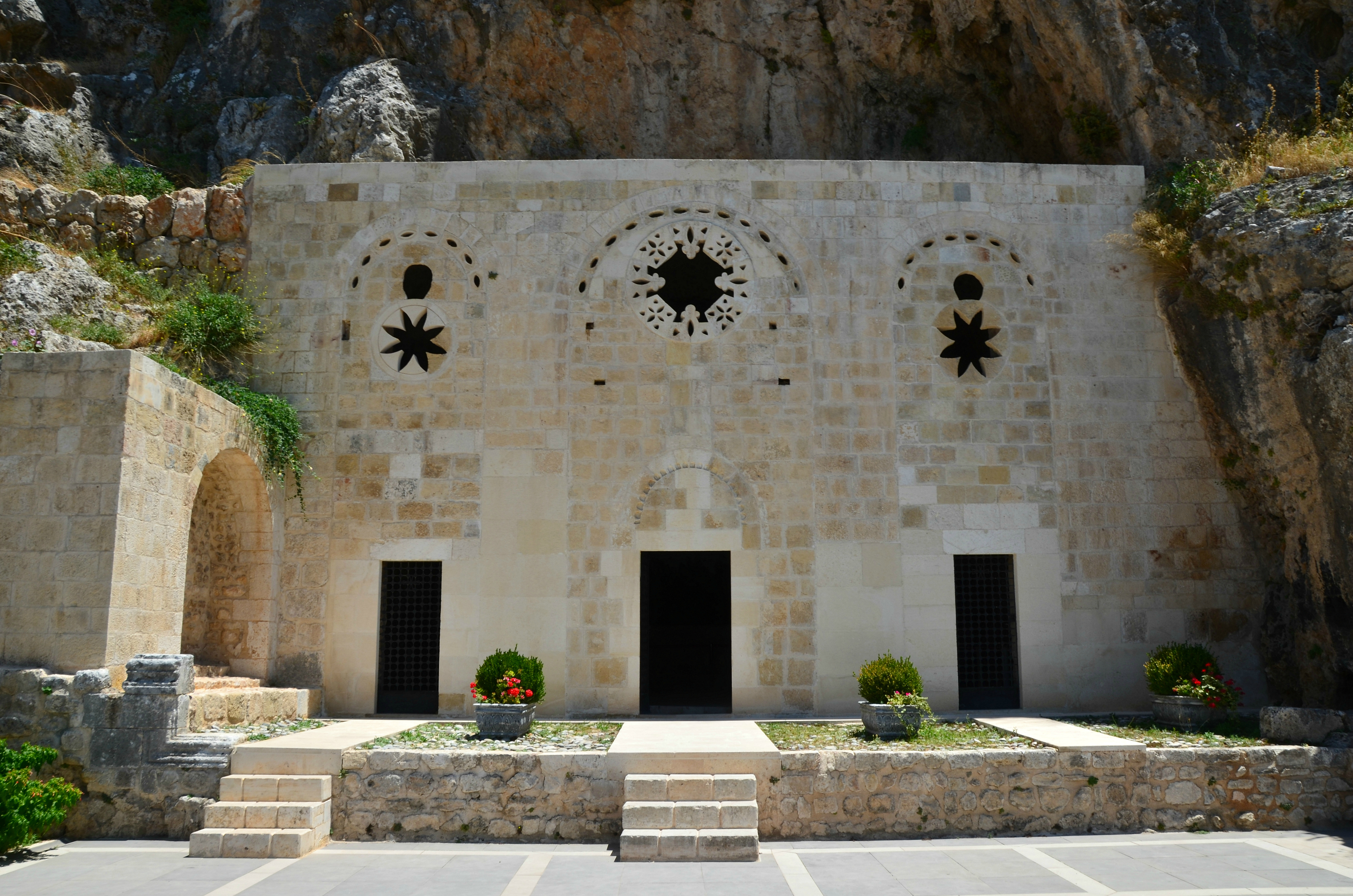
Church of Saint Peter, Antioch

The Church of Antioch (Arabic: كنيسة أنطاكية, romanized: kánīsa ʾanṭākiya, pronounced [ka.niː.sa ʔan.tˤaː.ki.ja]; Turkish: Antakya Kilisesi) was one of the five major churches of what later became the pentarchy in Christianity, with its primary seat in the ancient Greek city of Antioch (present-day Antakya, Turkey).

The earliest record of the church of Antioch is given in Acts 11, stating that some "men of Cyprus and Cyrene, which, when they had come to Antioch, spoke to the Grecians, preaching the Lord Jesus [...] and a great number believed, and turned to the Lord." Later, at the start of their missionary journeys, Paul the Apostle (also called Saul) and Barnabas preached in Antioch for a year, and followers of the church were called "Christians" for the first time.

== History ==
Followers of Jesus Christ trace the origin of the term Christian to the church community that developed in Antioch. The organized life of the early Christian church began after Jesus' resurrection and ascension, especially at Pentecost when the Holy Spirit was given to the apostles. Following the martyrdom of Stephen and the resulting persecution in Jerusalem, many believers were scattered into surrounding regions and preached the gospel as they went. Some of these dispersed believers reached Antioch, where they proclaimed the message to both Jews and Gentiles, and a significant community of disciples formed. When the church in Jerusalem learned of this development, it sent Barnabas to Antioch; Barnabas later retrieved Saul (Paul) from Tarsus, and the two taught the believers for a year. It was in Antioch that the followers of Jesus were first called "Christians".

According to verses 19–26 of Acts 11, Barnabas went to Tarsus in search of Saul and brought him to Antioch. They met with the church and taught for a year. The disciples, who had been scattered because of persecution in Jerusalem, were first called Christians in Antioch. One of the leading members of this group was Barnabas, who was sent to organize the new church. The group later became the Patriarchate of Antioch, part of the pentarchy as one of the five great patriarchates.

Saul, also known as Paul the Apostle, began his missionary journeys in Antioch. According to Acts, Judaizers from Jerusalem caused a disturbance in the church. Paul started his first missionary journey from Antioch and returned there. After the Jerusalem decree to the gentile converts in Antioch, Paul began his second missionary journey from Antioch. His third journey also began there. Ignatius then served as bishop there from 70 AD until his martyrdom in 107 AD.

Antioch served as a central point for sending missionaries to the gentiles, probably after the Great Commission. Nicolas, one of the Seven Deacons, was a missionary from Antioch.

Antioch was also the birthplace of John Chrysostom, a prominent Christian father who died in 407 AD.

The seat of the Patriarchate was originally in Antioch (in present-day Turkey). In response to the Ottoman invasion in the 14th century, it was moved to Damascus.

Some ancient synagogue priestly rites and hymns of Greek origin have partially survived to the modern day, particularly in the unique worship of the Melkite and Greek Orthodox communities in the Turkish Hatay province, Syria, Lebanon and northern Israel. Members of these communities still refer to themselves as Rūm, which literally means "Eastern Romans" or "Byzantines" in Turkish, Persian and Arabic. The term Rūm is preferred to Yūnāniyyūn, which means "Greek" or "Ionian".

== Successive branches ==
=== Oriental Orthodox ===
- The Syriac Orthodox Patriarchate of Antioch and All the East descends from the Antiochian Christians who rejected the Chalcedon and followed Patriarch Severus of Antioch, establishing a patriarchal line that continues to this day. In 2026, the present Patriarch is Patriarch Ignatius Aphrem II.

=== Eastern Orthodox ===
- The Greek Orthodox Patriarchate of Antioch and All the East are the descendants of those Antiochians who accepted Chalcedon, forming their own visible hierarchy under the Eastern Orthodox church. In 2026, the present Patriarch is John X (Yazigi).

=== Catholic ===
The Maronite, Melkite, and Syriac Catholic patriarchates are in full communion with the Catholic Church and thus recognise each other's claims. The Catholic Church also appointed a Latin Patriarch of Antioch in 1098 by way of Bohemond (founder of the Principality of Antioch, one of the crusader states). After the Crusades, this office became titular in 1268, and lasted as titular for many centuries until it was abolished in 1964.

The followers of the monk St.Maron emerged as a distinct hierarchy only in the 8th century following a schism with the Orthodox Patriarchate of Antioch over the Monothelite heresy; forming the Maronite Patriarch of Antioch and All the East, this community survived the later Muslim invasions and subsequently entered into a new union with the Roman Catholic Church during the 12th-century Crusades.

The Melkite Catholic Patriarchate of Antioch and of All the East, of Alexandria and of Jerusalem was created by the Chalcedonian faction of the Church of Antioch, otherwise known as Melkites by then patriarch Cyril VI Tanas, who chose to bring the patriarchate into communion with Rome. Those who rejected communion with the Pope remained as the unchanged Greek Orthodox Patriarchate of Antioch.

The Syriac Catholic Patriarchate of Antioch was the contiguous non-Melkite, non-Chalcedonian faction of the Church of Antioch first formed after the Council of Chalcedon. With the election of the Catholic-aligned Andrew Akijan as Syriac Patriarch of Antioch, the patriarchate subsequently re-entered into full communion with Rome, and later re-established communion again in 1782 with the election of Patriarch Michael III Jarweh as the same, with those who rejected communion with Rome forming the modern Syriac Orthodox Patriarchate of Antioch.

== See also ==
- Early Christianity
- Incident at Antioch
- God-fearer

== Sources ==
- Barnett, Paul (2005). The Birth of Christianity: The First Twenty Years. Wm. B. Eerdmans. ISBN 978-0-8028-2781-4.
- Dunn, James D. G. (2009), Christianity in the Making Volume 2: Beginning from Jerusalem, Wm. B. Eerdmans
