= Basilian =

Basilian may refer to a number of groups who are followers of Saint Basil the Great and specifically to:

- Basilian monks (founded c. 356), monks who follow the rule of Saint Basil the Great, in modern use refers to monks of Eastern Catholic Churches
- Order of Saint Basil the Great or Basilian Order of Saint Josaphat (founded c. 1631), a Greek Catholic monastic order
- Basilian Salvatorian Order (founded 1683), a religious order of the Melkite Greek Catholic Church
- Basilian Chouerite Order of Saint John the Baptist (founded 1696), a religious order of the Melkite Greek Catholic Church
- Basilian Aleppian Order (founded 1697), a religious order of the Melkite Greek Catholic Church
- Basilian Chouerite Sisters (founded 1737), a religious order of the Melkite Greek Catholic Church
- Basilian Aleppian Sisters (founded 1740), a religious order of the Melkite Greek Catholic Church
- Congregation of St. Basil (founded 1822), a Latin Catholic order of priests now active in the Americas
