= Neophytos of Chios =

- Patriarch of Antioch
- Church: Melkite Church
- See: Patriarch of Antioch
- Installed: 1673
- Term ended: 1682
- Predecessor: Macarios III Zaim
- Successor: Cyril V Zaim

Personal details
- Died: 1686

Patriarch Neophytos of Chios was Patriarch of Antioch from 1673 to 1682.

Though the family of Neophytos was originally from Chios, he was educated in Damascus under the Jesuits. He was the nephew of previous Patriarch Euthymius III of Chios and he was appointed vicar in Aleppo under the reign of Patriarch Macarios III Zaim. In 1672 he was appointed bishop of Hama.

At the death of Patriarch Macarios III in 1672, his nephew, Constantine Zaim, not yet twenty, was elected patriarch with the help of the governor of Damascus, was consecrated bishop and took the name of Cyril V. His election was contested by some bishops and by Dositheos, patriarch of Jerusalem, who considered his election to be null, pointing out that Cyril Zaim was not in the legal age to be appointed bishop. This party supported Neophytos of Chios, who went to Constantinople where in 1673 he obtained a firman in his favor from the Ottoman sultan and the appointment to Patriarch by the Ecumenical Patriarch Dionysius IV of Constantinople. This marked the first direct intervention of the Ecumenical Patriarch of Constantinople in the affairs of the See of Antioch.

Neophytos was in any case not recognized as Patriarch by all the faithful; thus the Patriarchate of Antioch split in two factions which alternatively succeeded to obtain, thank to financial support, the favor of the Sublime Porte. Cyril was granted official recognition three times, and Neophitos twice. The fight between the two claimants lasted nine years, until 1682 when Neophytos of Chios, because of his debts, decided to retire, leaving Cyril V Zaim as the only claimant. Neophytos retired also from the See of Hama and was appointed bishop of Latakia with the title of honorary Patriarch. He died in 1686.
