= Athanasius IV Jawhar =

Head of the Melkite Greek Catholic Church from 1788 to 1794

- Patriarch of Antioch
- Church: Melkite Greek Catholic Church
- See: Antioch
- Installed: 5 May 1788
- Term ended: 2 December 1794
- Predecessor: Theodosius V Dahan
- Successor: Cyril VII Siaj

Orders
- Consecration: 31 July 1759 (Bishop) by Cyril VI Tanas

Personal details
- Born: Michael Jawhar; 18 September 1733 Damascus
- Died: 2 December 1794 (aged 61)

Athanasius IV Ignace Michael Jawhar (or Jahouar or Jauhar or Giohar, 1733–1794) was Patriarch of the Melkite Greek Catholic Church from 1788 to 1794. He previously claimed to be patriarch from 1759 to 1764 and from 1765 to 1768.

== Life ==
Michael Jawhar was born in Damascus on 18 September 1733 and he was the great-nephew of patriarch Cyril VI Tanas. He entered in the Basilian Salvatorian Order taking the religious name Ignace. In 1759, Cyril VI Tanas, old and ill, decided to have Jawhar as successor, even if Jawhar was not jet ordained priest. Jawhar left his monastery without the permission of the superior and was ordained priest. Cyril VI Tanas summoned a synod of bishops on 30 July 1759 where he resigned and Jawhar succeeded being elected patriarch under the name of Athanasius. He was consecrated bishop the next 31 July by Cyril VI Tanas, who died a few months later, on 10 January 1760.

Although Jawhar's election was supported by the bishops of the Basilian Salvatorian Order (both Cyril VI and Jawhar were Salvatorians) who represented a minority in the Melkite population, the bishops of the Basilian Chouerite Order contested such election pointing out that Jawhar was not in the legal age to be appointed bishop. Rome, unaware that appointing a nephew was a common use in the Melkite Church before the union with Rome, not confirmed Jawhar's election and on 1 August 1760 appointed in his place the Chouerite Maximos Hakim as Patriarch.

The clashes for the patriarchate between anti-patriarch Jawhar against patriarch Maximos II Hakim (and later Theodosius V Dahan) from 1760 to 1768 were mainly due to the opposition between the two religious orders, the Basilian Salvadorians and the Basilian Chouerites and between the different communities from which they recruit members (the Salvatorians recruited mainly in the area of Damascus, while Chouerites recruited mainly in the area of Aleppo). Clashes with anti-patriarchs happened often in the pre-division Melkite Church: for example Cyril Dabbas was anti-patriarch from 1613 to 1628, Neophite of Chio was anti-patriarch from 1674 to 1684, Athanasius Dabbas from 1685 to 1694.

Jawhar did not submit to patriarch Maximos II Hakim and excommunicate him and all his partisans: for this reason Jawhar was in turn excommunicated on 1 August 1761. Nor Jawhar accepted as patriarch Theodosius V Dahan who was elected shortly later the death of Maximos Hakim: he answered consecrating two bishops by his own initiative. Jawhar appealed to the Pope and to support his position he traveled to Rome where he arrived in March 1762. The election of Theodosius Dahan was however confirmed on 23 September 1763 by the Roman Congregation of Propaganda Fide and on 23 December 1763 by another synod of the Mekite bishops. This solution was not accepted by the Basilian Salvadorians bishops in Lebanon who answered consecrating other three bishops (among them also the future patriarch Francis Siaj). Another synod was held in Lebanon on 13 February 1764 reaching this compromise: Jawahr became bishop of Saida while Theodosius Dahan remained patriarch but had to paid the huge debt that Jawahr made to support his claim. On 25 June 1764, the Pope formally confirmed the election of Theodosius Dahan and Jawhar accepted, thus the 1761 excommunication was lifted. In August 1764 Jawhar returned to Lebanon where anyway a few months later, in February 1765 he was again proclaimed patriarch by some bishops: Rome answered with a formal excommunication on 14 September 1765. Because of this excommunication most of Jawhar's partisans left him, and in 1768 he, along with four bishops, submitted to patriarch Theodosius Dahan: all excommunication were lifted and Jawhar remained bishop of Saida.

Athanasius Jawhar was finally elected legal patriarch on 5 May 1788 after the death of Theodosius Dahan. He was confirmed by the pope on 30 March 1789 and he received the pallium on 30 June 1790.

In 1790, he summoned a synod of bishop at the Holy Saviour monastery to begin to implement a canon law for the Melkite Church. Athanasius IV Jawhar died on 2 December 1794.

== Notes ==
Catholic Church titles
Preceded by Theodosius V	Patriarch of Antioch; 1788-1794	Succeeded by Cyril VII
