= Melkite Patriarchate of Antioch =

Melkite Patriarchate of Antioch may refer to:

- Melkite Catholic Patriarchate of Antioch
- Greek Orthodox Patriarchate of Antioch, historically

== See also ==
- Melkite
- Patriarchate of Antioch (disambiguation)
