= Basilia =

Basilia may refer to:

- Basilia (fly), a genus of bat flies
- Basilia (island) or Baltia, in Greco-Roman geography, a mythic island in northern Europe
- Basilia (name), a feminine given name
- Basel (Latin: Basilia), a city in Switzerland

== See also ==
- Basella, a genus of plants
- Basilea (disambiguation)
- Basilian (disambiguation)
