= Euthymios Saifi =

Euthymios Michael Saifi
- Bishop of Tyre and Sidon
- Church: Melkite Church
- See: Tyre and Sidon
- Installed: 1682
- Term ended: 8 October 1723
- Predecessor: Jeremy

Orders
- Consecration: 1682

Personal details
- Born: Michael Saifi; 1643 Damascus, Syria
- Died: 8 October 1723 (aged 79–80) Damascus, Syria

Euthymios Michael Saifi (or Aftimios Sayfi, 1643–1723) was the Melkite Catholic bishop of Tyre and Sidon during the early 18th century. A leading proponent of re-establishing communion between the Orthodox Church of Antioch and the Catholic Church, he is often described as the architect of the Melkite Catholic Church.

== Life ==
Michael Saifi was born in Damascus in about 1643. He was admitted in the entourage of patriarch Macarios III Zaim and he was schoolmate of Macaire's nephew, the future patriarch Cyril Zaim. Michael Saifi was ordained deacon in 1666, priest shortly later and appointed teacher of the patriarchal school. In 1682 he was consecrated bishop of Tyre and Sidon by Cyril Zaim, who has become patriarch in the meantime.

Saifi, like many clerics in the patriarchate of Antioch, wanted to formally re-establish ties to the Church of Rome. In December 1683 he openly declared himself in communion with the Roman Catholic Church.

Saifi founded the Basilian Salvatorian congregation and the Melkite Holy Savior Monastery (Deir-el-Moukhales) at Joun near Sidon. with the aim of supporting pastoral and missionary activities by well-educated and celibate Melkite clergy.

Four pro-Catholic Melkite bishops, who considered the 1694 agreement between Cyril Zaim and Athanase Dabbas over the patriarchal succession unlawful, urged Saifi to become patriarch. Saifi wrote to Rome, which forbade him to become patriarch, but appointed him Apostolic administrator for the Catholic faithful in the Melkite Church on 6 December 1701.

Saifi had a very strong missionary zeal, which led him to interfere in other dioceses' and patriarchates' affairs: he clashed with both the Maronite and the Jerusalem patriarchates. He and his missionaries promoted not only full communion with the See of Rome, but also many Liturgical Latinisations: for instance, different uses in fasting and a review of the liturgical books. These Latinizations were neither desired nor wanted by Rome, which condemned them many times (for example through the Propaganda Fide in 1723 and formally on 15 March 1729); regardless, they spread among some of the Catholic partisans of the Melkite Church.

Charging Saifi of meddling in other patriarchates affairs and of latinisations, in October 1718 Patriarch Jeremias III of Constantinople ordered him to be deposed and exiled. Patriarch Cyril Zaim of Antioch did not execute this order, but he died shortly later. Two bishops claimed succession to the former patriarch of Antioch: Euthimios Saifi himself and the former patriarch Athanasius III Dabbas, who was supported by the Patriarch of Constantinople and who signed the succession's agreements of 1694. Saifi's opposition to Dabbas was also combated by the Latin Franciscans, who supported Athanasius, forcing Saifi to renounce. Athanasius Dabbas, in a synod held in Constantinople in 1722, deposed and exiled Saifi to allow some Greek bishop to take possession of his important episcopal See. Saifi, still supported by his faithfuls, was exiled in Adana. He escaped in 1723 returning to Damascus, where he died on 8 October 1723.

One year after his death, through his work, his nephew, Seraphim Tanas, was elected as the Greek Patriarch of Antioch under the name Cyril VI.
