= Demandatam =

1743 apostolic constitution on Melkite liturgy

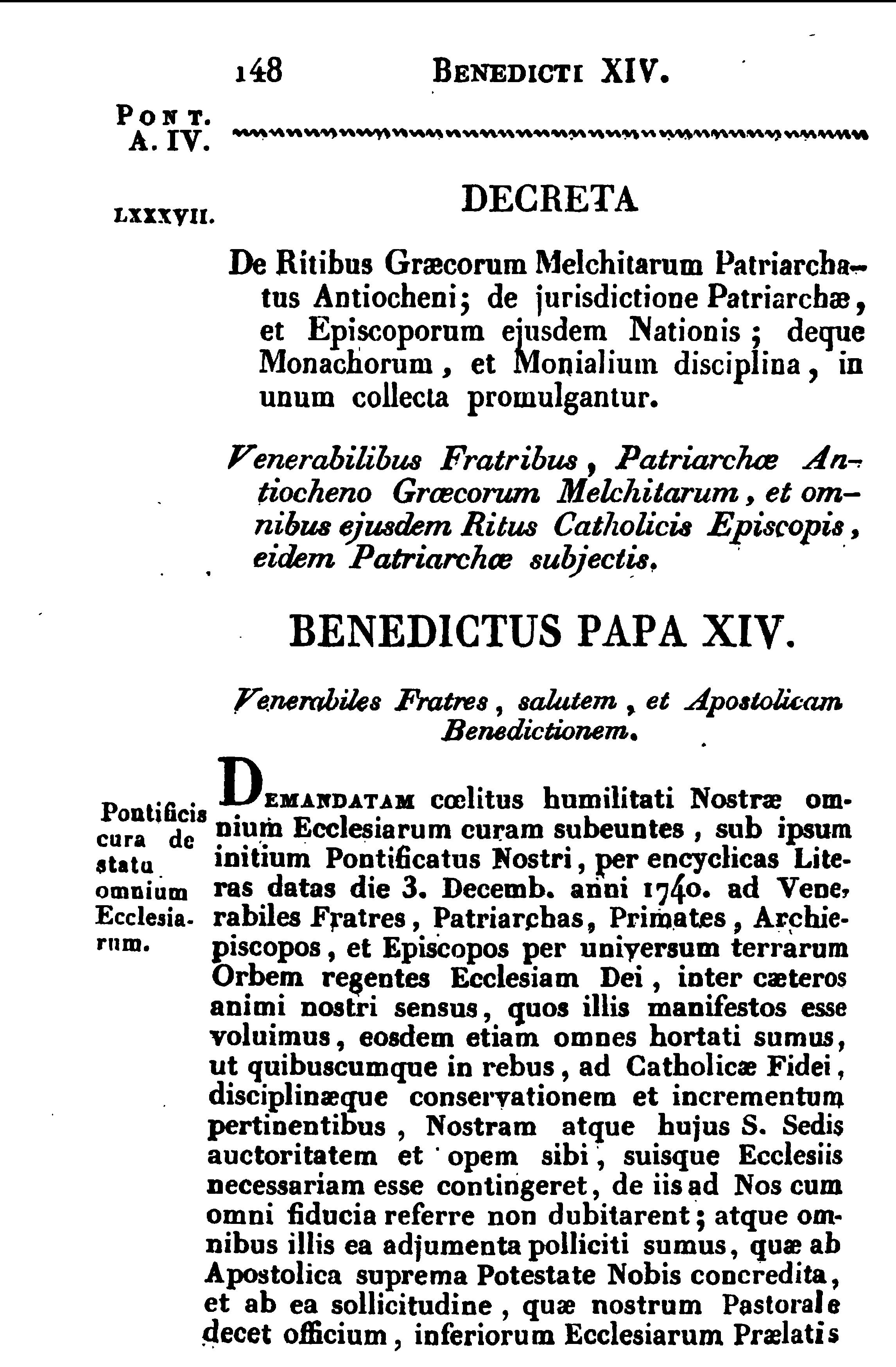
An 1828 print of the Demandatam

Demandatam coelitus humilitati nostrae is an apostolic constitution promulgated by Pope Benedict XIV on December 24, 1743, about the Melkite Greek Catholic Church. It is addressed to the Patriarch of Antioch Cyril VI Tanas and to all Melkite bishops under his jurisdiction, and is generally not considered ex cathedra. The subject of this apostolic constitution is the full preservation of the Byzantine Rite in the Melkite Greek Catholic Church.

== Historical context ==
In the first part of the 18th century, many liturgical latinisations were introduced in some Melkite Catholic communities, mainly by Euthymios Saifi and Cyril VI Tanas, and supported by many Latin Church missionaries (mainly Franciscans) against the wishes of the papacy. These changes led to a division in the Melkite Catholic Church between those who went on following the unmodified Byzantine Rite (as the Basilian Chouerite monks) and those who, named "Latinisers" in the apostolic constitution, mixed the Byzantine Rite with Latin practices. Rome had already taken measures against the uses of the "Latinisers" (e.g., the letters to Saifi in 1723 or the decree of July 8, 1729). However these measures did not resolve the issue, and in 1743, before granting the pallium to Cyril VI Tanas, Pope Benedict XIV issued the Demandatam apostolic constitution to put an end to the mixture of liturgical rites.

== Content ==
The main points of the apostolic constitution are:

- it is forbidden to any one, including the patriarch, to change, to add or to remove anything from the Byzantine Rite and uses (para. 3);
- it is forbidden to have any faithful to pass from the Byzantine Rite churches to the Latin Church (para. 15);

Concerning the "Latinisers" (who mixed the rites), the apostolic constitution orders that all the faithful baptized in the Byzantine Rite shall return to the Byzantine Rite. An exception is made for the area of Damascus where the "Latinisers" were numerous: they had to choose between the Byzantine and the Latin Rites, and follow it without later changes or mixtures (para. 16). This letter deals also with the disciplinary issues of the Melkite religious orders.

== See also ==
- Eastern Catholic liturgy
- List of encyclicals of Pope Benedict XIV
