= Theodosius V Dahan =

Head of the Melkite Greek Catholic Church from 1761 to 1788

- Patriarch of Antioch
- Church: Melkite Greek Catholic Church
- See: Patriarch of Antioch
- Installed: 26 December 1761
- Term ended: 30 March 1788
- Predecessor: Maximos II Hakim
- Successor: Athanasius IV Jawhar

Orders
- Consecration: 16 January 1736 (Bishop) by Cyril VI Tanas

Personal details
- Born: Joasaph Dahan; 1698
- Died: 30 March 1788 (aged 89–90)

Theodosius V (Athanase Joasaph) Dahan (1698–1788) was Patriarch of the Melkite Greek Catholic Church from 1761 to 1788.

== Life ==
Joasaph Dahan was born in Beirut in 1698. He entered in the religious order of the Basilian Chouerites and in 1723 he made the solemn vows under the name Joasaph. On 16 January 1736 he was consecrated metropolitan bishop of Beirut by patriarch Cyril VI Tanas, taking the name of Athanase. Shortly later his taking-possession of the diocese, the Melkite Orthodox party asked and obtained an own separated bishop, thus also in Beirut the hierarchy was definitely split, with Dahan who remained the bishop only for the Melkite Catholics.

Dahan was taken as coadjutor bishop by his predecessor Maximos II Hakim during his short reign, and after Maximos's death he was elected patriarch by a synod of bishops held on 26 December 1761 at the monastery of Saint Antony, taking the name of Theodosius. The group of bishops of the Basilian Salvatorian Order, who represented a minority in the Melkite population, did not recognized him as patriarch, as well as they had not recognized Maximos II Hakim, supporting in his place Athanasius Jawhar. They requested Rome to check the election of Theodosius Dahan, which however was confirmed on 23 September 1763 by the Roman Congregation of Propaganda Fide and on 23 December 1763 by another synod of the Mekite bishops.

Theodosius Dahan was thus formally confirmed by Rome on 23 June 1764 and he received the pallium, sign of the patriarchal authority, on 9 July 1764. The clashes seemed to be settled down, but in February 1765 Athanasius Jawhar again proclaimed himself (anti)patriarch. Only after the excommunication of Jawhar and the following reconciliation in 1768, the Melkite Church found its unity.

Rome appointed him also as administrator of the Catholics Melkites of Alexandria and Jerusalem, previously ruled by the Custodian of the Holy Land. Theodosius V Dahan died at 90 on 30 March 1788.
