= Patriarch Euthymius =

Patriarch Euthymius may refer to:

- Patriarch Euthymius I of Constantinople (834–917)
- Patriarch Euthymius II of Constantinople (c. 1340–1416)
- Patriarch Evtimiy of Bulgaria (Euthymius of Tarnovo) (1325–1402)
- Euthymius II Karmah, 17th-century Melkite Patriarch of Antioch
- Euthymius III of Chios, 17th-century Melkite Patriarch of Antioch
