= Cyril V =

Patriarch Cyril V may refer to:

- Patriarch Cyril V Zaim (about 1655 – 1720)
- Patriarch Cyril V of Constantinople (ruled 1748–1751 and 1752–1757)
- Pope Cyril V of Alexandria, Pope of Alexandria & Patriarch of the See of St. Mark in 1874–1927
