= Cyril VII =

Cyril VII may refer to:

- Cyril VII Siaj (ruled 1794–1796)
- Patriarch Cyril VII of Constantinople (ruled 1855–1860)
