= Cyril VI Tanas =

Melkite Greek Catholic patriarch

- Patriarch of Antioch
- Church: Melkite Greek Catholic Church
- See: Patriarch of Antioch
- Installed: September 24, 1724
- Term ended: January 10, 1760
- Predecessor: Athanasius III Dabbas (Note: Dink (2004), p. 33. Athanasius III was the last Orthodox patriarch of Antioch prior to the schism.)
- Successor: Maximos II Hakim

Orders
- Consecration: October 1, 1724 (Bishop) by Neophytos Nasri

Personal details
- Born: Seraphim Tanas; 1680 Damascus
- Died: January 10, 1760 (aged 79–80)

Patriarch Cyril VI Tanas, also known as Cyril VI of Antioch (1680, Damascus – January 10, 1760), became the first Patriarch of Antioch and of All the East, of Alexandria, and of Jerusalem of the Melkite Greek Catholic Church, following the schism of the Greek Orthodox Patriarchate of Antioch in 1724. Cyril established full communion with the Catholic Church.

== Life ==
Seraphim Tanas was born in Damascus in 1680, and he was the nephew of Euthymios Saifi, bishop of Sidon. On August 3, 1701, he arrived in Marseille, France, and from 1702 to 1710 he studied in the College of the Propaganda in Rome. Returning to Syria, he was ordained as a priest by his uncle; he (Tanas) became distinguished for his sermons, and Patriarch Cyril V Zaim appointed him "Preacher of the Patriarchate of Antioch".

Like many of his fellow clerics, Seraphim Tanas favored re-establishing full communion with the Roman Catholic Church. The Damascene Melkites elected him as the new Patriarch of Antioch on September 24, 1724, and he was consecrated as Cyril VI by Neophytos Nasri, eparch of Saidnaya—assisted by Basile Finas, eparch of Baniyas, and Euthymius Fadel, eparch of Zahle and Forzol—in the patriarchal cathedral of Damascus on October 1, 1724. (Note: September 24, according to the Julian calendar.) As Cyril was a prominent pro-Westerner, the Orthodox Patriarch Jeremias III of Constantinople felt that his authority was challenged thereby; Jeremias declared Cyril's election to be invalid, excommunicated him, and appointed a young Syrian monk—Sylvester of Antioch (1696–1766)—to the patriarchal See of Antioch. Jeremias consecrated Sylvester as bishop on October 8, 1724, (Note: September 27, according to the Julian calendar.) in Constantinople.

Sultan Ahmed III withdrew the recognition he had initially conferred upon Cyril, who was forced to flee as emissaries of Sylvester arrived from Constantinople with a mandate for his arrest. Cyril took refuge at the Holy Savior Monastery near Sidon, located in modern-day Lebanon, where his safety was guaranteed by the Shehab emirs. Sylvester unleashed a hard persecution against all who had elected or supported Cyril: many were exiled, and all churches were taken by Sylvester's party. This persecution strengthened the faith of the Catholic Melkites, who—even without a formal hierarchy—continued to increase in number, meeting in secret places and celebrating the Divine Liturgy in homes at night.

Although the populace of Aleppo was mainly pro-Catholic in sentiment, the people initially supported Sylvester; however, the latter's heavy-handed rule of the church led to many Melkites choosing to instead acknowledge Cyril VI as patriarch. The people united against Sylvester, forcing him to flee Aleppo. The Greek domination over the Byzantine Orthodox Patriarchate of Antioch lasted until 1899.

Notwithstanding the many requests by Cyril for recognition, the Papacy moved with great caution and took six years to recognize Cyril as the legitimate Patriarch of Antioch. The decision was made by Pope Benedict XIII, and was communicated to the Melkites in the synod held on April 25, 1730. From this time onward, the Melkite Greek Catholic Church has existed separately from and in parallel to the Greek Orthodox Church of Antioch in the Middle East. The pallium—formal recognition of patriarchal authority—was granted by Rome to Cyril only on February 3, 1744, about twenty years after the 1724 election.

The reasons for this caution and delay, in Rome's recognition of Cyril as patriarch, can be summarized as follows:

- Rome—having already had Catholic professions of faith from previous patriarchs Athanasius III Dabbas (in 1687) and Cyril V Zaim (in 1716)—hoped for a complete union with the Melkite Church, and did not wish to split the Melkite hierarchy. Only the persecutions by Sylvester, and the incoming Greek domination over the Byzantine Orthodox Patriarchate of Antioch, left no other choice.
- Cyril followed Euthymios Saifi in introducing many liturgical Latinisations, dividing thereby the Catholic Melkites into those who kept the Byzantine Rite untouched versus those who mixed the rites; for this reason, many Catholic Melkite monks were initially very suspicious of Cyril. As had already happened for Euthymios Saifi, the Pope took a strong position against Cyril's Latinisations, and his recognition in 1729 was subject to his renouncing any changes to the Byzantine Rite and usages. The Latinisations continued to be supported by many Latin missionaries (particularly the Franciscans), and remained a problem within the Melkite Church until the issue of the papal encyclical Demandatam (in December 24, 1743) put an end to the mix of rites. This same document forbade Latin missionaries to accept the faithful of Byzantine Rites into the Latin Rite.

Cyril VI Tanas summoned three different synods (in 1736, 1751, and 1756), seeking to provide further structure to the Melkite Church; in this, he met with mixed results, succeeding in establishing a foundation for the governance and expansion of the Melkite Catholic faithful (ultimately to result in his successor Maximos III Mazloum's triumphal return to Damascus, whence Cyril had been forced to flee), but failing to unite two of the main Melkite Basilian Orders—viz., the Basilian Salvatorian Order and the Basilian Chouerite Order of Saint John the Baptist.

Cyril renounced his position in 1759, and died on January 10, 1760, (Note: December 30, 1759, according to the Julian calendar.) having designated Athanasius IV Jawhar his replacement (though complications would lead to Maximos II Hakim becoming Cyril's immediate successor instead, with Athanasius being forced to wait one further term—that of Theodosius V Dahan—before ascending to the office himself).

== See also ==
- Patriarch of Antioch
- Melkite Greek Catholic Patriarchate of Antioch and All the East
- Melkite Greek Catholic Church

== Bibliography ==
- Descy, Serge (1993). The Melkite Church. Boston: Sophia Press.
- Dink, Iganatios (2004). Melkites: Greek Orthodox and Greek Catholics of the Patriarchates of Antioch, Alexandria and Jerusalem. Boston: Sophia Press.

Preceded by Athanasius III Dabbas	Bishop of Antioch; 1724–1760	Succeeded by Athanasius IV Jawhar
