= Cyril VII Siaj =

Head of the Melkite Greek Catholic Church from 1794 to 1796

- Patriarch of Antioch
- Church: Melkite Greek Catholic Church
- See: Patriarch of Antioch
- Installed: 11 December 1794
- Term ended: 6 August 1796
- Predecessor: Athanasius IV Jawhar
- Successor: Agapius II Matar

Orders
- Consecration: December 1763 (Bishop) by Euthymius Fadel

Personal details
- Born: François Siaj; 1735
- Died: 6 August 1796 (aged 60–61) Aitanite, Lebanon

Cyril VII François Siaj BS (or Siage or Siagi; circa 1735 – 6 August 1796) was Patriarch of the Melkite Greek Catholic Church from 1794 to 1796.

== Life ==
Francis Siaj was a monk of the Basilian Salvatorian Order. Between 1760 and 1768 he was an open partisan of Athanasius Jawhar in the clashes for the patriarchate between patriarch Theodosius V Dahan and anti-patriarch Athanasius Jawhar. In this frame he went with Jawhar to Rome in 1762, and when returned to Lebanon he was consecrated bishop of Bosra and Hauran a few days after 23 December 1763, and took the name Cyril. Because his consecration was celebrated by Euthymius Fadel bishop of Zahle and Forzol and a partisan of Jawhar, the patriarch Theodosius V Dahan did not recognized his appointment till the appeasement in 1768 between Theodosius Dahan and Athanasius Jawhar.

Cyril Francis Siaj was elected patriarch by the synod of bishops on 11 December 1794. His election was confirmed by Pope Pius VI on 28 June 1796. Cyril VII Siaj died on 6 August 1796 at Aitanite, where he was buried.

== Notes ==
Catholic Church titles
Preceded by Athanasius IV	Patriarch of Antioch; 1794–1796	Succeeded by Agapius II
