= Patriarch Cyril of Constantinople =

Patriarch Cyril of Constantinople may refer to:

- Cyril Lucaris (Patriarch Cyril I Lucaris, 1572–1638), patriarch for six terms between 1612 and 1638
- Patriarch Cyril III of Constantinople, patriarch in 1652 and 1654
- Patriarch Cyril V of Constantinople, patriarch in 1748–1757
- Patriarch Cyril VII of Constantinople, patriarch in 1855–1860

== See also ==
- Patriarch Cyril (disambiguation)
