= Abdallah Zakher =

Syrian typographer and Catholic deacon (1684-1748)

Abdallah Zakher (Arabic: عبدالله الزاخر, romanized: ʻabd Allāh az-Zāḵir; [ʕabdallaːh azzaːxir]) (1684–1748) was a Syrian-born (in Aleppo) typographer and Catholic deacon who set up the first printing press that used Arabic script.

His printing press used Arabic movable type and was installed in 1733 in the motherhouse of the Basilian Chouerite Order, the monastery of Saint John the Baptist at Khenchara in Mount Lebanon, where it still can be visited.

Zakher was also an accomplished writer and craftsman. He was a Melkite Christian at the time of the Church's reaffirmation of communion with the Catholic Church.

== Sources ==
- “The First Arabic Script Printing Press in Lebanon”, an article by Pascal Zoghbi, with pictures from the Zakher foundry.
- Tourist attractions report of Lebanon mentioning Zakher
- Intro to book on Zakher
- Jules Leroy and Peter Collin, Monks and Monasteries of the Near East (Gorgias Press, 2004), p. 122-123
