= Basilia (name) =

Basilia is a feminine given name. Notable people with the name include:

- Basilia de Bermingham, Irish religious patron
- Basilia de Clare, (fl. 1173–1201) Anglo-Norman noblewoman from the de Clare family.
- Basilia de Worcester, wife of Meyler de Bermingham

== See also ==
- Basilea (disambiguation)
