= Neophytos Nasri =

Catholic bishop (1670-1731)

- Bishop of Saidnaya
- Church: Melkite Greek Catholic Church
- Appointed: 1722
- Term ended: 1730

Orders
- Consecration: 1722 (Bishop) by Athanasius III Dabbas

Personal details
- Born: 1670 Aleppo
- Died: 21 February 1731 (aged 60–61) Rome

Neophytos Nasri (1670–1731) was a bishop of Saidnaya of the Melkite Greek Catholic Church and took a preeminent part in the 1724 split of the Melkite Church.

== Life ==
Nasrallah Néophytos Nasri was born in Aleppo in 1670. He entered young a monk in the Balamand Monastery and in 1696 he was one of the founders of the Basilian Chouerite Order. He also served as a preacher in Amid. In 1722 he was appointed bishop of Saidnaya, and consecrated Bishop in the same year by Patriarch Athanasius III Dabbas.

On October 1, 1724 he consecrated Cyril VI Tanas as bishop and Patriarch of the Melkite Church, so originating the split of the Melkite Church. After persecutions from the Orthodox party, he had to leave Saidnaya and in 1730 he moved to Rome, where he died on 21 February 1731 and was buried in the chapel of Propaganda Fide.

A biography of Néophytos Nasri was written by his disciple Ignatius Quandalaft.
