= Patriarch Kirilo =

Patriarch Kirilo (Serbian Cyrillic: Патријарх Кирило) may refer to:

- Kirilo II, Serbian Patriarch, Serbian Patriarch (1759–1763)

== See also ==
- Kirilo
- Patriarch Cyril (disambiguation)
