= Basilea (disambiguation) =

Basilea is the Italian and Romansh name for Basel, a city in Switzerland.

Basilea may also refer to:

- Basilea (bacterium), a genus of bacteria
- Basilea (queen), first queen of the legendary Kingdom of Atlantis in Ancient Greek folk tradition
- 2033 Basilea, a main-belt asteroid
- Basilea Pharmaceutica, a Switzerland-based biopharmaceutical company
- Basilea Amoa-Tetteh (born 1984), Ghanaian footballer
- Basilea Schlink (1904–2001), German religious leader
- Solomon Aviad Sar-Shalom Basilea (c. 1680–1743), Italian rabbi

== See also ==
- Basella, a genus of plants
- Basilia (disambiguation)
