= Basilian Chouerite Sisters =

Order of the Melkite Greek Catholic Church

The Basilian Chouerite Sisters is a religious order of the Melkite Greek Catholic Church and considered as the female branch of the Basilian Chouerite Order.

The order was founded in 1737 and approved in 1763 by Pope Clement XIII. The first house of the congregation was the Monastery of the Annunciation at Zouk Mikael.
