= Jules Leroy =

French priest and researcher (1903–1979)

Jules Leroy (1903 in Ablis – 1979 in Chaptelat) was a French priest and researcher in the domains of Syriac, Coptic and Ethiopian manuscripts, art and architecture.

As a novice he joined the French Benedictine congregation of Solesmes in their exile on the Isle of Wight. From 1930 to 1933 Leroy studied at the Pontificio Istituto Biblico in Rome.

Leroy's early researches in iconography of Pre-Chalcedonian Christian churches were guided by Henri Seyrig in the Lebanon and by the historian of art, André Grabar. A researcher in the French Centre National de Recherche Scientifique, Leroy was attached to the Institut d' Etudes et de Recherches d' Ethiopie in Addis Ababa.

== Sources ==
- René-Georges Coquin, Necrologie, Syria, Vol. 57 (1980), p. 502-503.
- Palmer, A.N. and Ginkel, J., 'Leroy, Jules' in Dictionary of Art 19 (1996), p. 231-232.

Selected publications

- Les Manuscrits Syriaques à peinture conservés dans les Bibliothèques d'Europe et d' Orient. Contribution à l' étude et à l' iconographie des églises de langue syriaque, Geuthner, 1964.
- Ethiopie, archéologie et culture, Desclée de Brouwer, 1973.
