= Cyril V Zaim =

- Patriarch of Antioch
- Church: Melkite Greek Catholic Church
- See: Patriarch of Antioch
- Term ended: 16 January 1720
- Predecessor: Neophytos of Chios
- Successor: Athanasius III Dabbas

Personal details
- Born: Costantine Zaim about 1655 Aleppo
- Died: 16 January 1720 Damascus

Patriarch Constantine Cyril V Zaim (about 1655–1720), sometimes known also as Cyril III, was Patriarch of Antioch.

== Life ==
Constantine Zaim was born in about 1655 in Aleppo and he was the nephew of Patriarch Macarios III Zaim, who died in 1672. Immediately after, Constantine Zaim was elected patriarch with the help of the governor of Damascus, and on July 2, 1672, he was consecrated bishop by Gregory of Bosra, Leonce (Lawandius) of Saidnaya and another two bishops, and enthroned taking the name of Cyril V around 18 years of age. His election was contested by some bishops and by Dositheos, patriarch of Jerusalem, who considered his election to be null, pointing out that Cyril Zaim was not the legal age to be appointed bishop. This party supported Neophytos of Chios, nephew of previous Patriarch Euthymius III of Chios, who went to Constantinople where he obtained a firman in his favor from the Ottoman sultan and the appointment to patriarch by the Ecumenical Patriarch Dionysius IV of Constantinople, thus splitting the Patriarchate of Antioch in two factions. In 1682 Neophytos of Chios, because of his debts, decided to retire, leaving Cyril V Zaim as the only claimant.

This situation soon changed: the next contender of the patriarchal throne was Athanasius Dabbas who was supported by the Franciscan friars (who opposed Cyril Zaim, charged with simony) and by his maternal uncle Michael Khayat, very influential with the Sublime Porte. In 1685 Michael Khayat succeeded to get from the Ottoman Empire a firman that appointed Athanasius Dabbas as patriarch of the Melkite Church. Thus on July 5, 1685, Athanasius Dabbas was consecrated bishop and enthroned as patriarch with the name of Athanasius III.

The next nine years were marked by the conflict between the two claiming patriarchs, Cyril V Zaim and Athanasius III Dabbas. The fight ended on October 1694 when the two rivals came to an agreement after the arbitration of Salmon, an Aleppian Jew. The terms of the agreement were: Athanasius recognized Cyril as patriarch in change of 13.000 Écus, the appointment to the See of Aleppo, and the right to succession at Cyril's death. This agreement was judged in 1698 null by the Vatican, which continued to consider as Patriarch Athanasius, who in 1687 made a Roman Catholic profession of faith.

In 1716 the reigning Patriarch Cyril V Zaim also made a Roman Catholic profession of faith and was received into communion with Rome on May 9, 1718, He died in Damascus on 5 January 1720, and was succeeded by Athanasius III Dabbas.
