= Macarius III Ibn al-Za'im =

- Patriarch of Antioch
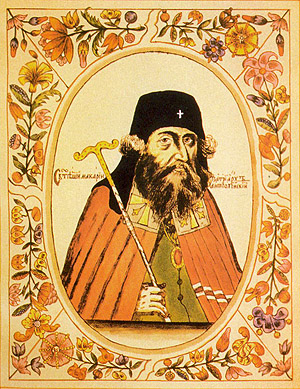
- Church: Church of Antioch
- See: Patriarch of Antioch
- Installed: 12 November 1647
- Term ended: 12 June 1672
- Predecessor: Euthymius III of Chios
- Successor: Neophytos of Chios

Orders
- Consecration: 27 October 1635 by Euthymius III of Chios

Personal details
- Born: Yousef Za'im Aleppo
- Died: 12 June 1672 Damascus

Patriarch Macarius (or Makarios) III Ibn al-Za'im (Arabic: مكاريوس الثالث بن الزعيم, romanized: Makāriyūs aṯ-Ṯāliṯ bin az-Zaʿīm; born Yousef Za'im, died 1672) was Patriarch of Antioch from 1647 to 1672. He led a period of blossoming of his Church and is also remembered for his travels in Russia and for his involvement in the reforms of Russian Patriarch Nikon.

== Life ==
Yousef Za'im was born in Aleppo, son of the priest Paul; he was a disciple of Euthymius II Karmah. He was ordained priest (taking the name of Yuhanna) after marrying. He also used to work as weaver. In 1627 Za'im had a son Paul (sometime known as Paul of Aleppo), who became his secretary and biographer.

After the death of his wife in 1627, he retired to the Mar Saba monastery until 1634. On October 27, 1635, he was consecrated metropolitan bishop of Aleppo by Patriarch Euthymius III of Chios (taking the name of Meletius), who also appointed him catholicos (supervisor) of the whole patriarchate. As Metropolitan of Aleppo he led a bright and rich period for the Christians of Aleppo. In 1624 he led a pilgrimage to Jerusalem where he met the Catholicos of Georgia, whom he accompanied to Damascus. In 1647 he had to escape for a time from Aleppo because of persecution by the governor.

After the death of Patriarch Euthymios III, he went to Damascus where he was elected Patriarch and consecrated on November 12, 1647, by four metropolitans, under the name of Macarius III. His first aim was to restore the financial situation of the Patriarchate, which had deteriorated because of the excessive taxation of the Ottomans towards the Christians. In order to get financial help, he decided to start a long journey into the Eastern Europe countries. After having appointed and consecrated one vicar, on February 11, 1652, he took the road north, accompanied by his son Paul. He visited Constantinople, Wallachia (where he was well received by Prince Matei Basarab), Moldavia (where he met Prince Vasile Lupu), Ukraine (meeting with hetman Bohdan Khmelnytsky) and Tsardom of Russia.

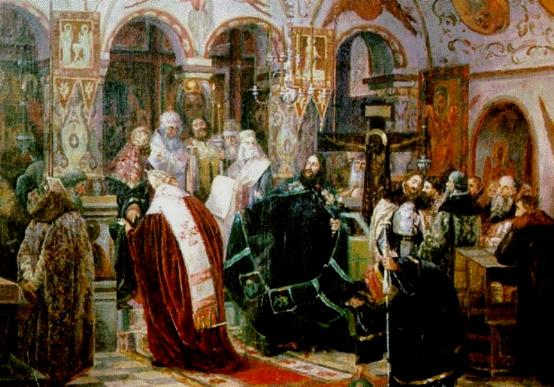
Deposition of Patriarch Nikon

He was in Moscow from January 26, 1655, to May 29, 1656, as the guest of Tsar Alexis. During this visit he had a large part in the religious and liturgical reform of the Russian Patriarch Nikon, mainly because he brought with him the new recension of the Euchologion made by Euthymius II Karmah and other liturgical books of the Patriarchate of Antioch. Nikon's liturgical reform led to a major schism in the Russian Orthodox Church, the so-called Raskol, or schism of the Old Believers. Macarius Za'im also took a stand in favor the validity of the Catholic baptism of Poles, and his suggestion was approved. Macarius nevertheless lamented over the atrocities committed by the Polish Catholics against followers of Greek Orthodoxy. Macarius took as his example the religious peace that ruled in the Turkish empire, stating: God perpetuate the empire of the Turks for ever and ever! For they take their impost, and enter no account of religion, be their subjects Christians or Nazarenes, Jews or Samaritans; whereas these accursed Poles were not content with taxes and tithes from the brethren of Christ.

He was back in Damascus in 1659, where he succeeded in settling the debts of the patriarchate and excommunicated the Metropolitan of Homs, Athanasius Ibn Amish, who acted as patriarch. In 1660 Macarius III blessed the Holy Myron for all the patriarchate, the first time this had been done since 1594. Until 1661 he was quite reserved towards the Latin missionaries in Syria, but his attitude subsequently changed and he wrote many times to the Pope and maintained very good relations with the missionaries. According to historian Charles A. Frazee, Macarius III went so far as to secretly send a profession of the Catholic faith to Rome while publicly appearing to be in the Orthodox camp.

In 1666 Patriarch Macarius III left again for Moscow, invited by Tsar Alexis and accompanied by Patriarch Paisius of Alexandria, to pronounce the deposition of Patriarch Nikon at the Great Moscow Synod. Ecumenical Patriarch of Constantinople Parthenius IV assembled a Synod, in which Paisius and Macarius deprived Patriarchal Thrones for their trip to Moscow for the trial of Nikon.

Macarius is known as a shameless trader of indulgences, which he sold in large quantities in Wallachia, in Ukraine and in Russia.

He asked the Polish king John Casimir to work for the union between the Eastern and Western Churches. He returned to Syria in 1672. He did not participate in the Synod of Jerusalem. He died, probably poisoned, in Damascus on June 12, 1672.

== Works ==
Macarius III was a prolific writer in Arabic. Among his writings are:

- Life of Saint Paraskevi the New
- Chronicle of the Principality of Wallachia from 1292 to 1664
- Notebook, 48 excerpts and translations from Greek made during his trip to Russia
- Synaxarion
- Book of the Bee
- a treatise on Byzantine hymnography
- correspondence with the pope, the Congregation for the Propagation of the Faith and King Louis XIV of France

== Sources ==
- Frazee, Charles A. (2006) [1983]. Catholics and Sultans: The Church and the Ottoman Empire 1453-1923. Cambridge: Cambridge University Press. ISBN 978-0-521-02700-7.
