= Melkite Catholic Patriarchate of Antioch =

Eastern Catholic patriarchate headquartered in Syria

Melkite Greek Catholic Patriarchate of Antioch and All the East بطريركيّة أنطاكية وسائر المشرق للروم الملكيين الكاثوليك

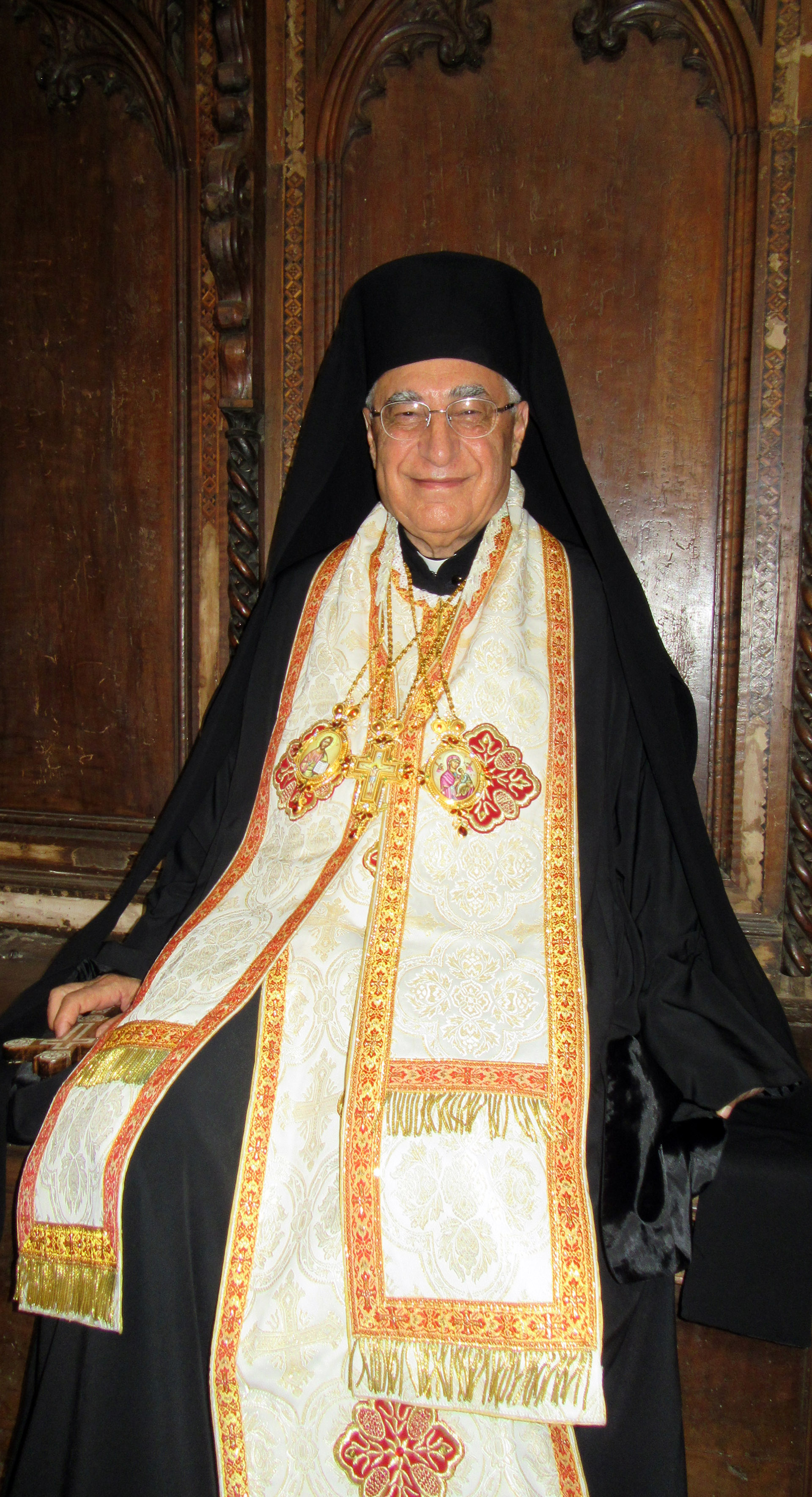
- Patriarch Youssef Absi
- Type: Antiochian
- Classification: Eastern Catholic
- Orientation: Byzantine Catholic
- Scripture: Septuagint, New Testament
- Theology: Catholic theology
- Polity: Episcopal
- Pope: Leo XIV
- Primate: Youssef Absi, Patriarch of Antioch and All the East (since June 21, 2017)
- Language: Koine Greek (historical), Aramaic (Classical Syriac) (historical), Arabic (official), English, French, Portuguese, Spanish, and other languages (extended)
- Headquarters: Cathedral of Our Lady of the Dormition, Damascus, Syria
- Territory: Primary: Syria, Lebanon, Palestine, Jordan, Iraq, Egypt, parts of Turkey, and Sudan; Extended: North America, South America, Western, Southern and Central Europe, Australia, New Zealand
- Founder: Apostles Peter and Paul
- Independence: A.D. 519
- Branched from: Church of Antioch
- Separations: Georgian Orthodox Church – 1010; Greek Orthodox Patriarchate of Antioch – 1724
- Members: Approx. 1.6 million (2024)
- Official website: melkitepat.org

The Melkite Greek Catholic Patriarchate of Antioch (Greek: Μελχίτικο Πατριαρχείο Αντιοχείας), also known as the Melkite Catholic Church, and legally as the Rūm Greek Catholic Patriarchate of Antioch and All the East (Arabic: بطريركيّة أنطاكية وسائر المشرق للروم الملكيين الكاثوليك, romanized: Baṭriyarkiyyat ʾAnṭākiya wa-Sāʾir al-Mašriq li-r-Rūm al-Malakiyyīn al-Kāṯūlīk), is an sui iuris Byzantine Rite Eastern Catholic Church in full communion with the Holy See. It originates from the historic Church of Antioch, which according to tradition, was founded by the Apostles Peter and Paul. The church is headed by the Melkite Greek Catholic Patriarch of Antioch and maintains its own distinct Byzantine liturgical tradition and ecclesiastical governance.

== History ==
The Melkite Greek Catholic Church traces its origins to the ancient Christian community of Antioch, one of the earliest centers of Christianity. After the Council of Chalcedon in 451, the Church of Antioch experienced divisions, leading to the formation of multiple branches. The term Melkite (from Syriac malkāyā, meaning "imperial") originally referred to those who accepted Chalcedonian Christology and remained aligned with the Byzantine emperor.

In 1724, a schism occurred within the Chalcedonian Melkite Church when Cyril VI Tanas was elected patriarch and sought communion with Rome. The portion of the Church that rejected communion with Rome remained within the Eastern Orthodox Church, forming the modern Greek Orthodox Patriarchate of Antioch.

== Structure and leadership ==
The Melkite Catholic Patriarch of Antioch's complete title is: Patriarch of Antioch and of All the East, of Alexandria and of Jerusalem of the Melkite Greek Catholic Church, incorporating its other titular patriarchates. The patriarchal cathedral is the Cathedral of Our Lady of the Dormition (Arabic: كاتدرائية سيدة النياح للروم الملكيين في دمشق) in Damascus, Syria. It was visited by Pope John Paul II in 2001.

== Membership and distribution ==
The Melkite Greek Catholic Church has approximately 1.6 million members worldwide. Its territorial jurisdiction includes Syria, Lebanon, Jordan, Palestine, and parts of Egypt and Iraq. The Melkite diaspora extends to Europe, the Americas, and Australia, where it has established parishes and eparchies.

The Church continues to maintain its Byzantine heritage while remaining fully Catholic, preserving the traditions of Eastern Christianity within the larger communion of the Catholic Church.

== Proper province and archdiocese ==
The Patriarch also holds the office of Metropolitan of an empty Ecclesiastical province without an actual suffragan see, actually comprising only his proper Metropolitan Archeparchy of Damascus (of the Melkites) also, in Latin: Damascenus Græcorum Melkitarum (with terms in other relevant languages: Damasco [Curiate Italiano]; Arabic: دِمَشق, romanized: Dimašq; and, locally, aš-Šām). Like the Patriarchate, in Rome it depends only upon the Congregation for the Oriental Churches.

During a vacancy in the Patriarchate (such as following the resignation of Gregory III Laham in 2017), the bishop of the permanent synod who is most senior by ordination serves as administrator in chief of the Melkite Greek Catholic Church.

As of 2014, it pastorally served three thousand Catholics in eight parishes and one mission with: nine priests (six diocesan, three religious); three deacons; thirty‑three lay religious (three brothers, thirty sisters); and ten seminarians.

== Titular patriarchates ==
In continuation of the earlier Melkite patriarchates of the ancient sees of Alexandria and of Jerusalem, two titular patriarchates exist. These are however simply titles, vested in the residential Patriarch of Antioch, which also have Catholic residential counterparts:

- Melkite Catholic Titular Patriarch of Alexandria
- Melkite Catholic Titular Patriarch of Jerusalem

== List of eparchs and archeparchs ==
The following is a list of Melkite Greek Catholic Patriarchs of Antioch, Alexandria and Jerusalem. Those Patriarchs who were born in Syria are indicated with a symbol 'α', those born in Egypt with 'β', and those born in Lebanon with 'γ'. Eparch is equivalent to bishop, and archeparch to archbishop:

- Cyril VI Tanas, (Note: Born in Syria) October 1, 1724 – death July 8, 1759
- Athanasius IV Jawhar (or Jaouhar) (first term), July 19, 1759 – August 1, 1760; then Eparch of Saida of the Greek-Melkites (Lebanon), 1761 – May 5, 1788. For Jawhar's § second term, see below
- Maximos II Hakim BC, (Basilian Chouerite Order of Saint John the Baptist), October 20 – death November 15, 1761; previously Archeparch of Aleppo of the Greek-Melkites (Syria), 1732 – August 1, 1760
- Theodosius V Dahan BC, December 24, 1761 – death April 10, 1788; previously Metropolitan Archeparch of Beirut of the Greek-Melkites (Lebanon), 1736 – December 24, 1761
- Athanasius IV Jawhar (second term), May 5, 1788 – death December 2, 1794. For Jawhar's § first term, see above
- Cyril VII Siaj BS, December 11, 1794 – death August 6, 1796; previously Metropolitan Archbishop of Bosra of the Greek-Melkites (Syria), 1763 – December 11, 1794
- Agapius II Matar BS, (Basilian Order of the Most Holy Saviour), September 11, 1796 – February 2, 1812; previously the Superior General of his order, 1789–1795; Eparch of Saïdā of the Greek-Melkites (Lebanon), 1795 – September 11, 1796
- Ignatius IV Sarrouf, BC, 1812
- Athanasius V Matar BS, 1813
- Macarius IV Tawil BS, 1813–1815
- Ignatius V Qattan, 1816–1833
- Maximos III Mazloum, 1833–1855
- Clement Bahouth BS, (Note: Born in Egypt) 1856–1864
- Gregory II Youssef-Sayur BS, 1864–1897
- Peter IV Jaraijiry, (Note: Born in Lebanon) 1898–1902
- Cyril VIII Geha, 1902–1916
- Sede vacante, vacant 1916–1919
- Demetrius I Qadi, March 29, 1919 – October 25, 1925
- Cyril IX Moghabghab, December 8, 1925 – September 8, 1947
- Maximos IV Sayegh SMSP, October 30, 1947 – November 5, 1967; elevated to cardinal in 1965
- Maximos V Hakim, November 22, 1967 – November 22, 2000
  - Jean Assaad Haddad as Apostolic Administrator, June 6, 2000 – November 29, 2000
- Gregory III Laham BS, November 29, 2000 – May 6, 2017
  - Jean-Clément Jeanbart as Administrator, May 6, 2017 – June 21, 2017
- Youssef I Absi SMSP, June 21, 2017 – present

== Auxiliary bishops ==
The following is a list of auxiliary bishops of the episcopate of the See of Antioch:

- François Abou Mokh BS (Salvatorian Fathers), 1996 – July 27, 1998
- Isidore Battikha BA (August 25, 1992 – February 9, 2006
- Jean Mansour SMSP, August 19, 1980 – 1997
- François Abou Mokh BS, February 7, 1978 – 1992
- Elias Nijmé BA, August 16, 1971 – October 20
- Saba Youakim BS, September 9, 1968 – October 20
- Nicolas Hajj, July 30, 1965 – November 3, 1984
- Néophytos Edelby BA (Basilian Aleppian Order), December 24, 1961 – March 6, 1968
- Pierre Kamel Medawar, SMSP (Melkite Paulists), March 13, 1943 – 1969

== Gallery ==
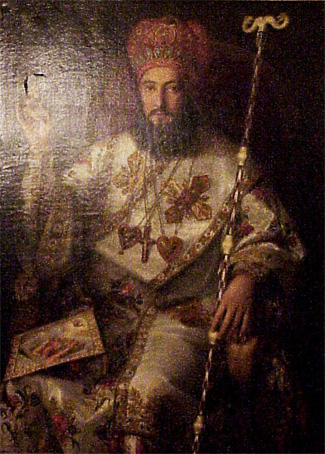
Maximos III Mazloum

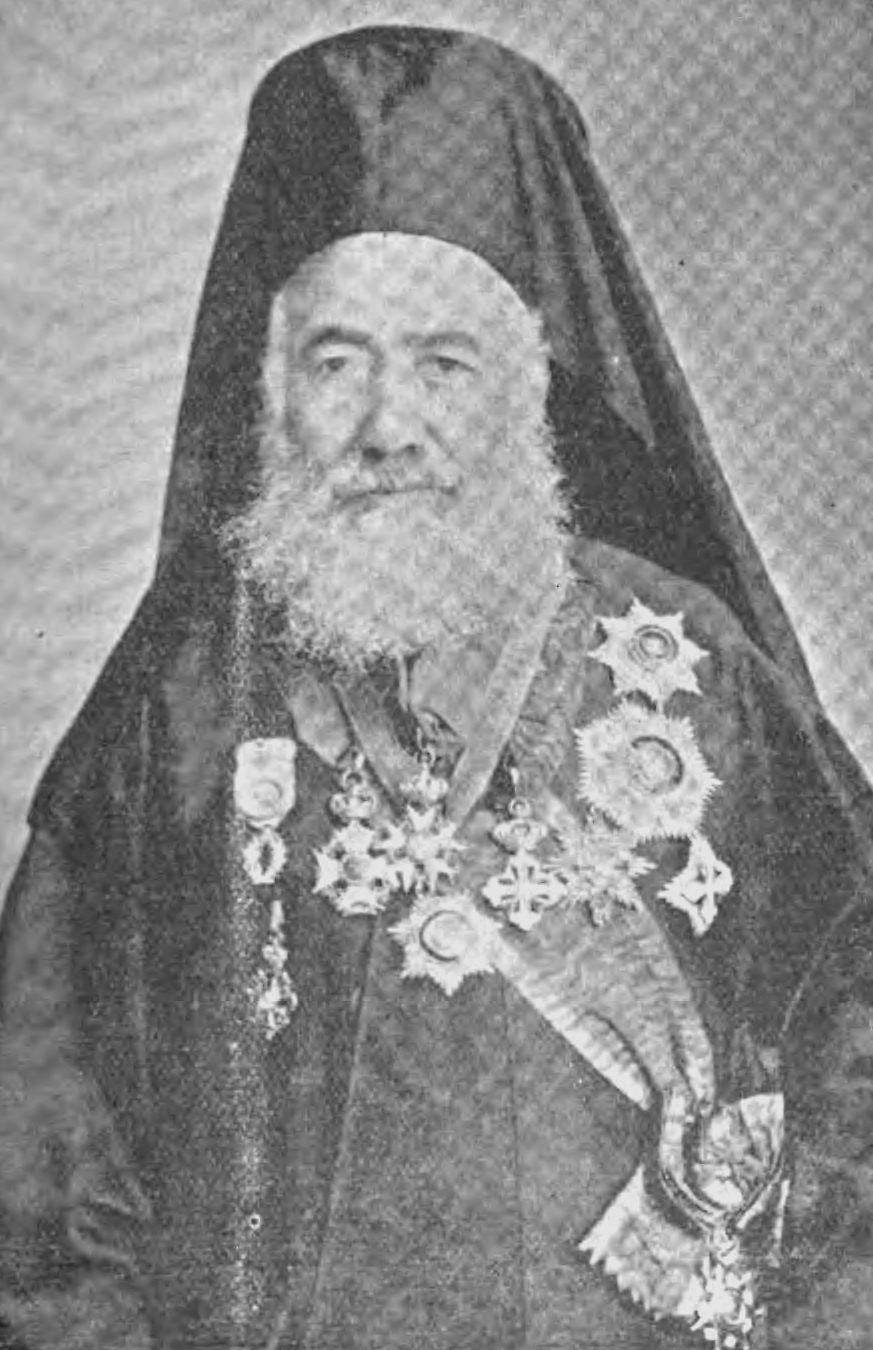
Gregory II Youssef

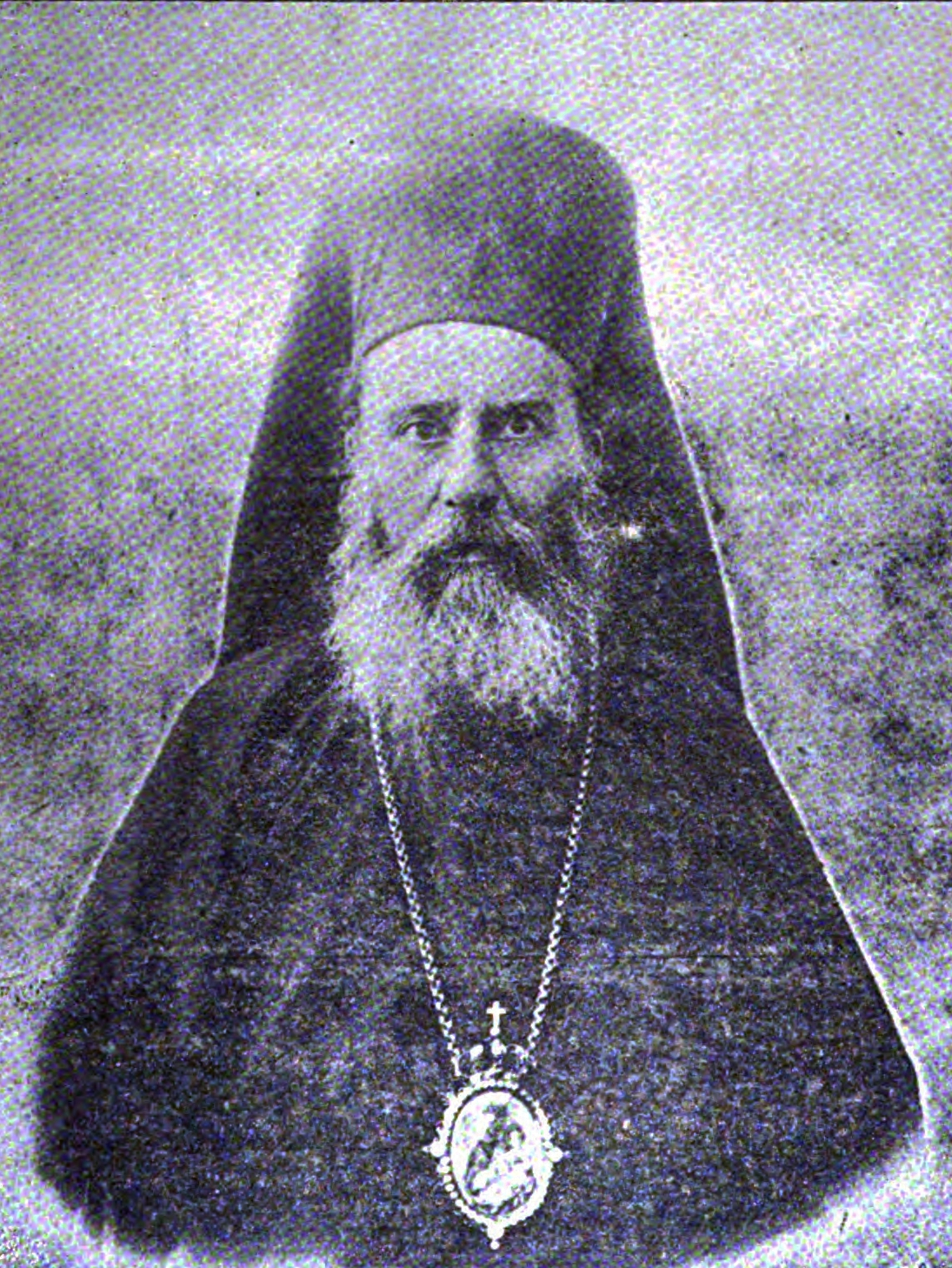
Peter IV Jeraigiry

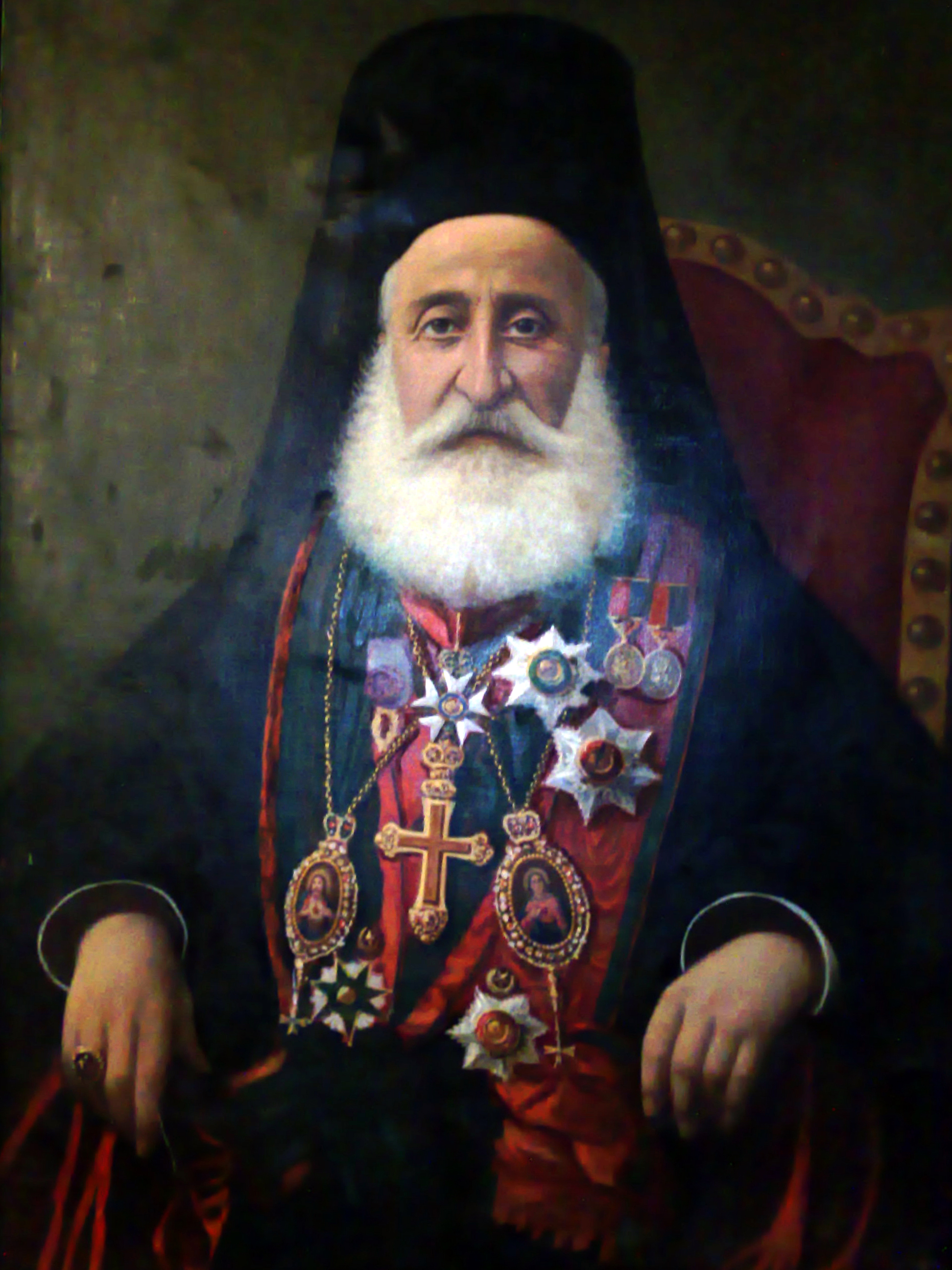
Cyril VIII Geha

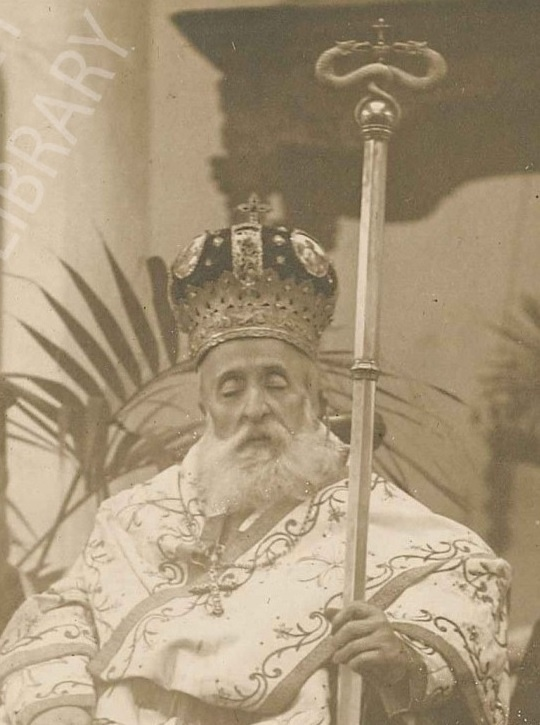
Demetrius I Qadi

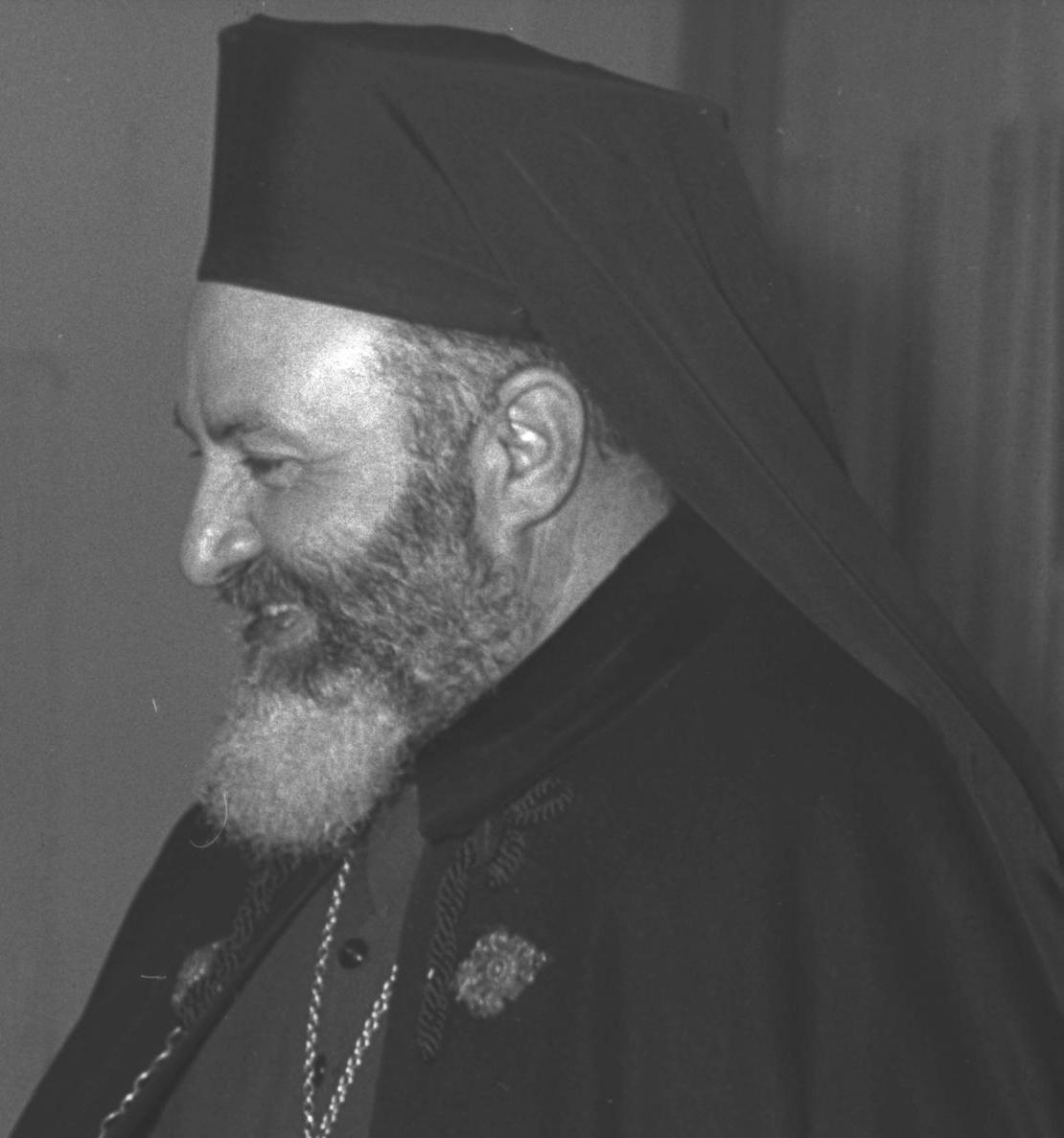
Maximos V Hakim

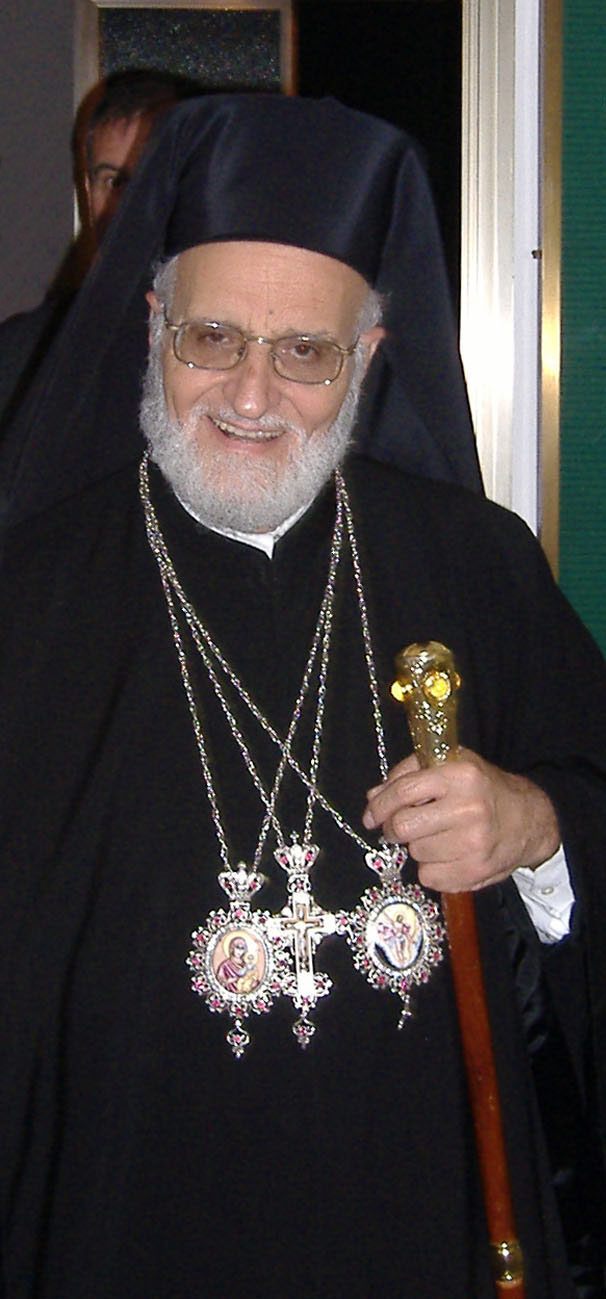
Gregory III Laham

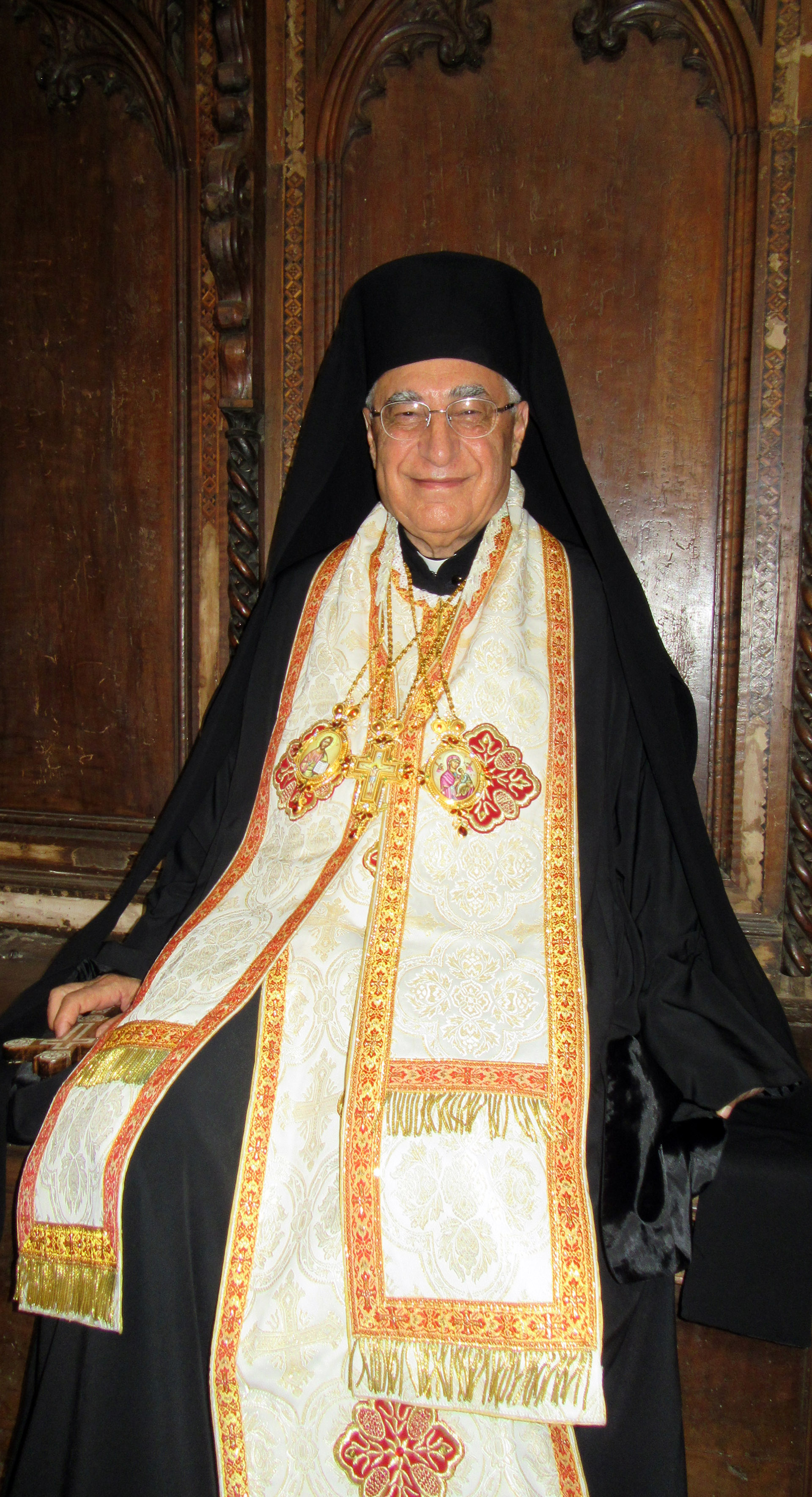
Youssef Absi

== See also ==
- List of Catholic dioceses in Syria
- Latin Patriarchate of Antioch
- List of popes
- Council of Catholic Patriarchs of the East
