= Euthymius III of Chios =

- Patriarch of Antioch
- Church: Melkite Church
- See: Patriarch of Antioch
- Installed: 1635
- Term ended: 11 October 1647
- Predecessor: Euthymius II Karmah
- Successor: Macarios III Zaim

Personal details
- Died: 11 October 1647 Damascus

Patriarch Meletios Euthymius III of Chios (died 11 October 1647), sometimes known also as Euthymius IV, was Melkite Greek Patriarch of Antioch from 1635 to 1647.

== Life ==
Meletios was born from a family originally from Chios and he entered in the Mar Saba monastery of which he became hieromonk. He was known as painter of icons and thus he was called to Damascus to paint the Melkite cathedral. His name as Patriarch was suggested by the dying Patriarch Euthymius II Karmah, and shortly after Karmah's death (1 January 1635) Meletios was accordingly elected. His episcopal and patriarchal consecration was performed by Philotheos of Homs, Simeon of Saidnaya and Joachim of Zabadani and he took the name of Euthymius III.

He is remembered as "timid" Patriarch, and he had not the courage of his predecessor. His relationships with the Latin missionaries in Syria were very good even if he never wrote directly to the pope. He died of illness in Damascus on 11 October 1647.
