= Sylvester of Antioch =

Orthodox Patriarch of Antioch (1724–1766)

- Occupation: Clergyman

Sylvester (Patriarche Sylvesteros I Dabbas) was Greek Orthodox Patriarch of Antioch (1724–1766), the first patriarch after the Catholic schism. He was the nephew of Patriarch Athanasius III Dabbas. He was a figure of importance in the history of Arabic printing.

== Literature ==
- Hage, Wolfgang (2007). Das orientalische Christentum. Stuttgart: Kohlhammer Verlag. ISBN 9783170176683.
- Ţipău, Mihai. "Sylvester of Antioch: Life and Achievements of an 18th-Century Christian Orthodox Patriarch," Berlin, Boston: De Gruyter, 2025. https://doi.org/10.1515/9783110988420
- Ibrahim, Habib (2025). The Correspondence of Mūsā Ṭrābulsī (1732–1787): Critical Edition, English Translation, and Introduction. Berlin/Boston: De Gruyter. doi:10.1515/9783111649276. ISBN 978-3-11-164223-9. OCLC 1545081162.

Preceded by Athanasius III Dabbas	Eastern Orthodox Patriarch of Antioch; 1724–1766	Succeeded by Philemon of Antioch
