= Basilian Salvatorian Order =

Eastern Catholic monastic order

Basilian Order of the Most Holy Saviour
- Latin: Ordo Basilianus Sanctissimi Salvatoris Melkitarum
- Abbreviation: BS
- Nickname: Salvatorian Fathers
- Formation: 1684 (342 years ago)
- Founder: Archbishop Euthymios Michael Saifi
- Founded at: Saida, Lebanon
- Type: Monastic order of pontifical right for men
- Headquarters: Saida, Lebanon
- Members: 94 members (includes 74 priests) as of 2020
- Superior General: Antoine Rizk, BS
- Affiliations: Greek-Melkite Catholic Church

The Basilian Order of the Most Holy Saviour (Latin: Ordo Basilianus Sanctissimi Salvatoris) abbreviated BS, also known as the Basilian Salvatorian Order, is an Eastern Catholic monastic order of Pontifical Right for men of the Melkite Greek Catholic Church. The name derives from its motherhouse, the Holy Saviour Monastery, at Joun in Chouf near Sidon, Lebanon.

== History ==
The order was founded in 1683 by Euthymios Saifi, bishop of Saida, with the aim of supporting pastoral and missionary activities by well-educated Melkite clergy, choosing for them the rule of Saint Basil. Saifi started to gather some monks in his episcopal residence, but it soon became too small for the community. In 1685 a miracle was reported during a pastoral visit of Euthymios Saifi to the village of Joun and thus some monks were sent to live in a farm near Joun. In 1710 Saifi succeeded in buying the farm and in 1711 the first building of the Holy Saviour monastery was erected.

The order was cited by Pope Benedict XIV in 1743 in the encyclical Demandatam, and on 20 April 1751 the Pope sent them a letter urging them to fully follow the Byzantine rite rejecting the Latinizations introduced by Cyril Tanas against the wishes of Rome. Their specific rules (constitutions) were formally drafted and approved only in 1934.

The Basilian Salvatorian Order soon became one of the two main religious orders of the Melkite Catholic Church. The other order was the Basilian Chouerite Order. According to their tradition, the Basilian Salvatorian Order had a more missionary aim, while the Basilian Chouerite Order was more contemplative. The Basilian Salvatorian Order recruited in the areas of Damascus and South Lebanon, while the Basilian Chouerite Order recruited in the areas of Aleppo, Homs, North Lebanon and Galilee. Attempts to unite these two orders from 1736 to 1768 failed: the opposition between them and between the different communities from which they recruit members is an important aspect to understand in the early history of the Melkite Catholic Church.

Up to the first half of the 19th century, these two religious orders ran a large number of parishes and provided most of the bishops of the Church. With the increasing importance of the celibate diocesan priests since the patriarchate of Maximos III Mazloum, the religious orders lost some of their importance. The 19th century saw moments of difficulty in the life of the Basilian Salvatorian Order: the main problems were the lack of respect for the vow of poverty by some monks and the antagonism between the Damascene wing and the Lebanese wing. Reforms in the early years of the 20th century solved the issues.

== Statistics ==
As of 31 December 2020, the Basilian Salvatorian Order had 27 monasteries and 94 monks, of which 74 are priests. In 2012, it had 11 houses and 92 members (including 87 priests).

In the United States it maintains a center in Methuen, Massachusetts. The Order serves the Church in four main areas: pastoral service in parishes, social service, ecumenical activity and dialog among different religious communities in Lebanon.

== Prelates from the order ==
The Basilian Salvatorian Order has given more than sixty bishops and eight Patriarchs to the Melkite Church: Cyril VI Tanas, Athanasius IV Jawhar, Cyril VII Siaj, Agapius II Matar, Athanasius V Matar, Macarius IV Tawil, Clement Bahouth, and Gregory II Youssef; Patriarch emeritus Gregory III Laham is also a member of this Order.

== See also ==
=== Maronite orders ===
- Baladites
- Antonins
- Aleppians
- Kreimists or Lebanese missionaries

=== Melkite orders ===
- Basilian Chouerite Order
- Basilian Aleppian Order
