= Melkite =

Christian churches of the Byzantine Rite

Melkite (/ˈmɛlkaɪt/) or Melchite churches are various Eastern Christian churches of the Byzantine Rite, and their members. The name comes from the Central Semitic root m-l-k (Note: Syriac: malkoyo (ܡܠܟܝܐ), Hebrew: 'מלך' melk-i or melech-i, and Arabic: ملكي malak-ī) 'royal', referring to the loyalty to the Byzantine emperor, and became a denominational designation for Christians who accepted imperial religious policies, notably the Council of Chalcedon (451).

Originally, during the Early Middle Ages, Melkites used both Medieval Greek and Aramaic languages in their religious life, and initially employed the Antiochian rite in their liturgy, but later (10th–11th century) accepted the Constantinopolitan rite, and incorporated Arabic alongside present-day surviving Western Neo-Aramaic in parts of their liturgical practices.

In modern times, there are two denominations called Melkite: Orthodox Melkites, the Greek Orthodox Christians of the Near East, and Catholic Melkites, members of the Melkite Catholic Church. Melkites can be of various ethnic origins, and Melkite can be the denominational component of ethnoreligious classifications.

== Background ==
Ecclesiastical order, established by the Council of Chalcedon (451)

The Melkites view themselves as the first Christian community, dating the Melkite Church back to the time of the Apostles. Accordingly, notably to Vatican historiographers and the Ecumenical Patriarchate of Constantinople, this first community is said to have been mixed, made up of individuals who were Greek, Copts, Roman, Aramean, Arabs and Jewish. Secular historians like Edward Gibbon and Ernest Renan held similar views regarding the emergence of the Melkite community.

The emergence of Christological controversies in the first half of the 5th century gave rise to divisions among Eastern Christians in various regions of the Near East. Official state support, provided by the Byzantine imperial government to adherents of Chalcedonian Christianity (451), provided the base for a specific use of Aramaic terms that designated those who were loyal to the empire, not just in regard to their political loyalty, but also in relation to their acceptance of imperial religious policies. Throughout the Near East, all Christians who accepted state-backed Chalcedonian Christianity became known as Melkites, a term derived from the Hebrew word melekh (cognate with Aramaic malkā or malkō 'ruler, king, emperor'), thus designating those who are loyal to the empire and its officially imposed religious policies.

Melkites designated all loyalists, regardless of ethnicity (e.g. Greeks, Copts, Hellenized Jews, Arameans, Arabs, and others), thereby including not only Greek-speaking Chalcedonians, but also those among Aramaic-speaking, Arabic-speaking, and Judeo-Christians, who were followers of Chalcedonian Christianity. Pro-Chalcedonian Christians throughout Byzantine Syria, Phoenicia, Palestine and Egypt were thus commonly known as Melkites. Since the Melkite communities were dominated by the Greek episcopate, the position of Aramaic-speaking and Arabic-speaking Melkites within the wider Melkite community was somewhat secondary to that of the Greek Melkites. This led to the gradual decline of Syriac-Aramaic traditions. Classical Syriac was originally the liturgical language of the Syriac Melkites in Antioch, and parts of Syria, while some other Aramaic-speaking Melkites, including Jewish converts, used the Syro-Palestinian dialect in Palestine and Transjordan instead. The Syriac Melkites changed their church's West Syriac Rite to that of Constantinople in the 9th–11th centuries, requiring new translations of all their Classical Syriac liturgical books. The decline of Syriac-Aramaic traditions among Melkites was reinforced (since the 7th century) by gradual Arabization, which also affected Greek-speaking Melkite communities, since under Islamic rule Arabic became the main language of public life and administration.

== Orthodox Melkites ==
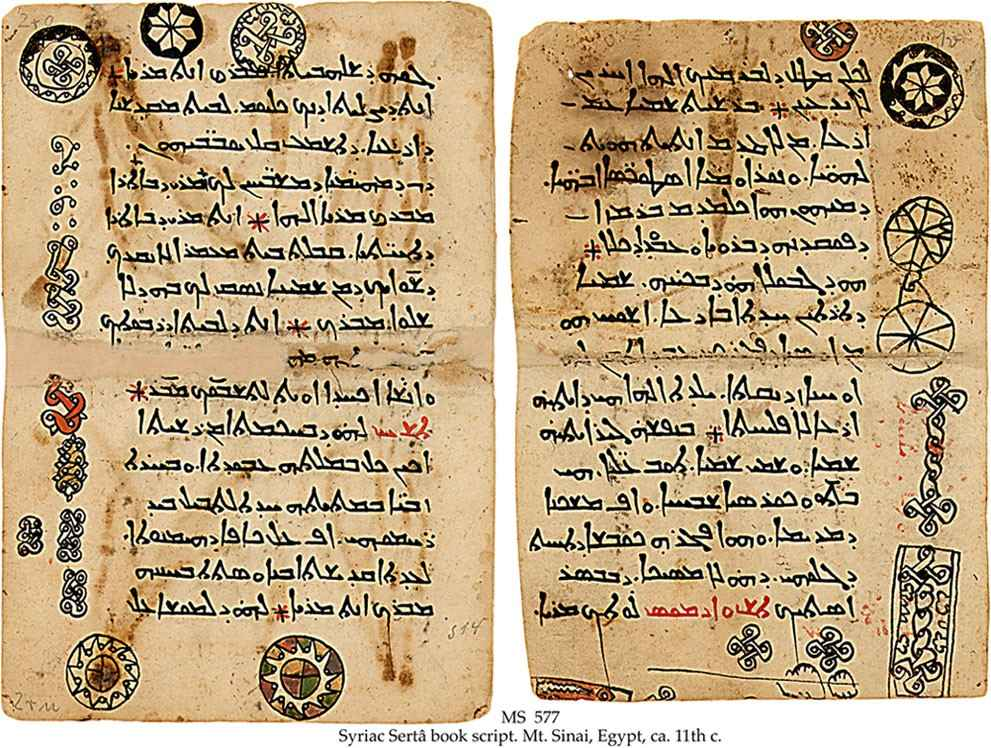
11th-century Melchite Hirmologion written in Syriac Sertâ book script, from Saint Catherine's Monastery, Mount Sinai, now part of the Schøyen Collection.

Internal divisions that emerged after the Council of Chalcedon (451) in the eastern patriarchates of Alexandria, Antioch, and Jerusalem, gradually led to the creation of distinctive pro-Chalcedonian (Melkite) and non-Chalcedonian branches, that by the beginning of the 6th century evolved into separate hierarchical structures.

Chalcedonian (Melkite) patriarchates of Alexandria, Antioch, and Jerusalem remained in communion with the Ecumenical Patriarchate of Constantinople. On the other side, among miaphysite non-Chalcedonians, parallel patriarchates emerged in Alexandria (miaphysite Coptic Church) and Antioch.

In Byzantine Palestine, the pro-Chalcedonian (Melkite) party prevailed, as well as in some other regions, like the Nubian kingdom of Makuria (in modern Sudan), that was also Chalcedonian, in contrast to their non-Chalcedonian Ethiopian Tewahedo neighbours, from c. 575 until c. 710 and still had a large Melkite minority until the 15th century.

Main Melkite Orthodox churches are:

- Greek Orthodox Patriarchate of Alexandria
- Greek Orthodox Patriarchate of Antioch
- Greek Orthodox Patriarchate of Jerusalem

Some typically Grecian "ancient synagogal" priestly rites and hymns have survived partially to the present, notably in the distinct church services of the Melkite and Greek Orthodox communities of the Hatay Province of Southern Turkey, Syria and Lebanon. Members of these communities still call themselves Rūm, which literally means "Romans" in Arabic (that is, those of the Eastern Roman Empire, what English speakers often call "Byzantines"). The term Rūm is used in preference to Yūnāniyyūn, which means "Greeks" or "Ionians" in Classical Arabic and Biblical Hebrew.

The Orthodox Saint, Raphael Hawaweeny, reports that:

There is a local tradition which says that when the Caliph Umar Ibn Al-Khattab wanted to write the document of guardianship to Patriarch Sophronius, after he had heard that Christians were divided into different groups such as Jacobites, Nestorians, Armenians, Maronites, and so forth, he asked him: "What is the name of your branch of Christianity?" Sophronius entreated him to give him some time so that he could find a good name pleasing to the Caliph. While he was absorbed in praying fervently, he was inspired to call his people by the first word he would hear in the service. Then listening attentively, he heard the Deacon reading the fifth Psalm from the first hour: "Oh my King and my Lord." Then he knew that he should call his people "the Royal People, or the Kingly People." Upon finishing his prayer he told the Caliph that they should be called "Royal People," or "Melkites." The Caliph approved this name and ... From that time till the end of the Arabic period, the Orthodox people of Palestine and Syria came to be called the Royal People.

This local tradition is interpreted by some members of the Brotherhood of the Holy Sepulchre to argue that Patriarch Sophronius was Greek, and therefore claim that the term Melkite refers specifically to the Greek nation and ethnicity as a "Royal People", often as justification for racial discrimination against non-Greeks, which Saint Raphael argues against.

== Catholic Melkites ==
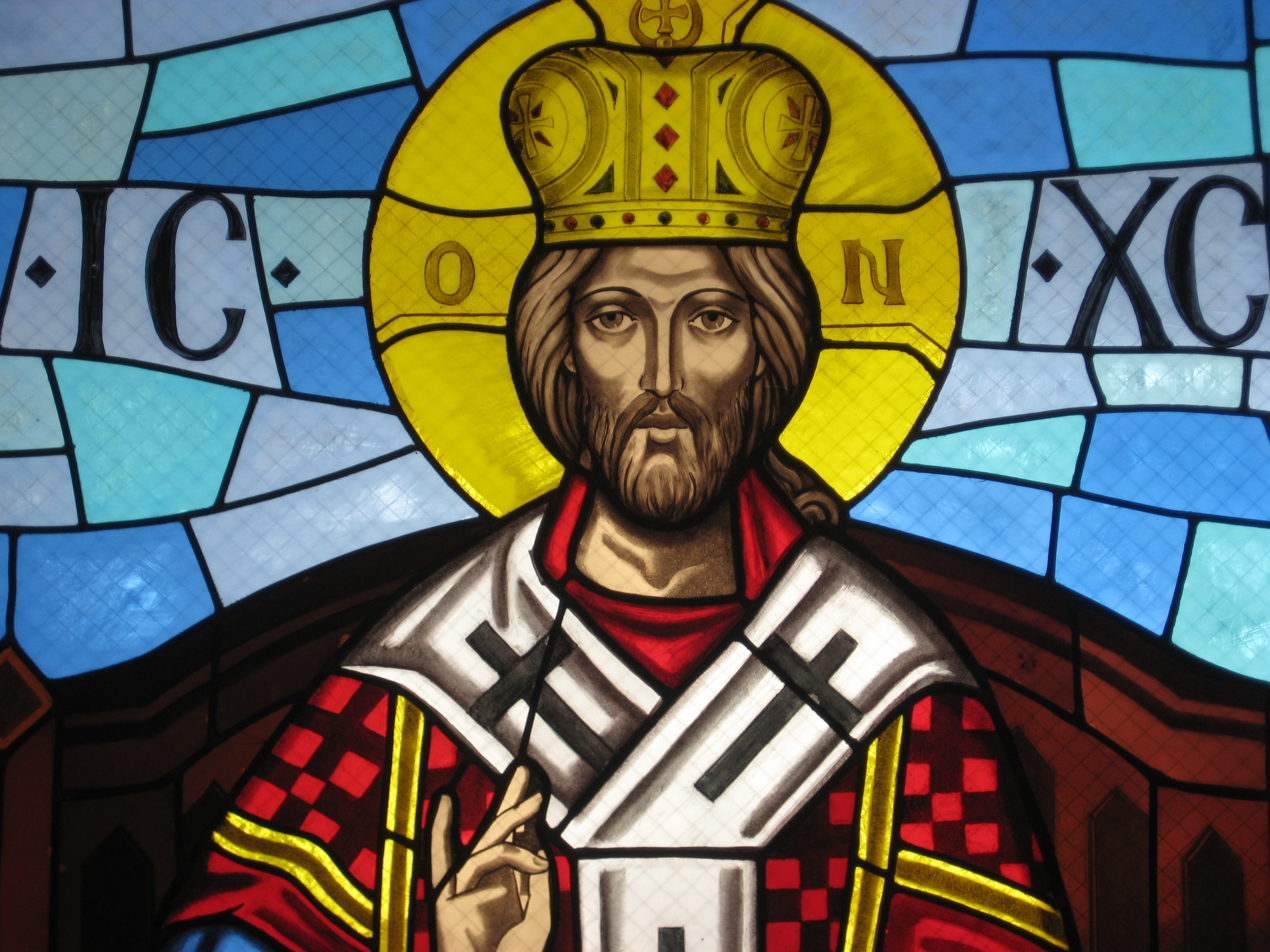
Melkite Catholic art of Christ the King in a Byzantine bishop’s regalia at the Annunciation Cathedral in Boston, Massachusetts.

From 1342, there were Catholic clergy who were based in Damascus and other areas who had worked toward a union between Rome and the Orthodox. At that time, the nature of the East–West Schism, normally dated to 1054, was undefined, and many of those who continued to worship and work within the Melkite Church became identified as a pro-Western party. In 1724, Cyril VI was elected in Damascus by the Synod as Patriarch of Antioch. Considering this to be a Catholic takeover attempt, Jeremias III of Constantinople imposed a deacon, the Greek monk Sylvester to rule the patriarchate instead of Cyril. After being ordained a priest, then bishop, he was given Turkish protection to overthrow Cyril. Sylvester's heavy-handed leadership of the church encouraged many to re-examine the validity of Cyril's claim to the patriarchal throne.

The newly elected Pope Benedict XIII (1724–1730) also recognized the legitimacy of Cyril's claim and recognized him and his followers as being in communion with Rome. From that point onwards, the Melkite Church was divided between the Greek Orthodox Church of Antioch, who continued to be appointed by the authority of the patriarch of Constantinople until the late 19th century, and the Melkite Greek Catholic Church, who recognize the authority of the pope of Rome. However, it is now only the Catholic group who continue to use the title Melkite; thus, in modern usage, the term applies almost exclusively to the Arabic-speaking Greek Catholics from the Middle East.

== See also ==
- Antiochian Greek Christians
- Jewish Christians
- Lebanese Christians
  - Lebanese Greek Orthodox Christians
  - Lebanese Melkite Christians
