= Patriarch of Antioch =

Traditional title held by the bishop of Antioch and all the East

Christian

Information
- First holder: Saint Peter
- Denomination: Eastern Orthodox, Oriental, Eastern Catholic
- Sui iuris church: Melkite, Maronite, Syriac Catholic
- Rite: West Syriac Rite, Byzantine Rite
- Established: 34 AD (founded) 451 AD (granted title of patriarch)

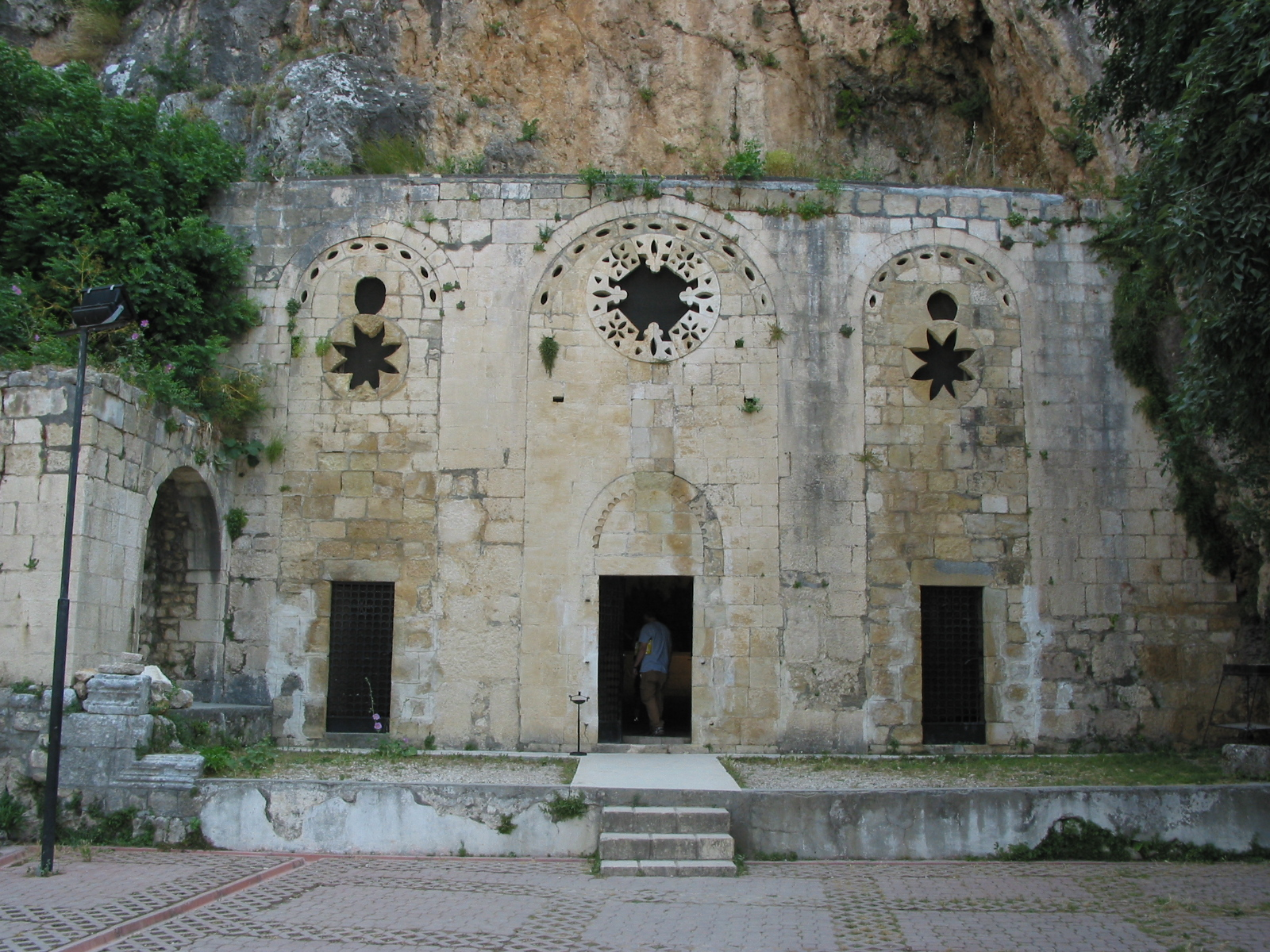
The Church of Saint Peter in Antioch, modern Antakya, Turkey

Patriarch of Antioch is a traditional title held by the bishop of Antioch (modern-day Antakya, Turkey). As the traditional "overseer" (ἐπίσκοπος, episkopos, from which the word bishop is derived) of the first gentile Christian community, the position has been of prime importance in Pauline Christianity from its earliest period. This diocese is one of the few for which the names of its bishops from the apostolic beginnings have been preserved.

Today five churches use the title of patriarch of Antioch:

- Oriental Orthodox
  - Syriac Orthodox Church
- Eastern Orthodox
  - Greek Orthodox Church of Antioch
- Eastern Catholic
  - Syriac Catholic Church
  - Maronite Church
  - Melkite Greek Catholic Church.

According to church tradition, this ancient patriarchate was founded by an Apostle, Saint Peter. The patriarchal succession was disputed at the time of the Meletian schism in 362 and again after the Council of Chalcedon in 451, when there were rival Melkite and non-Chalcedonian claimants to the see. Following a 7th-century succession dispute in the Melkite Church, the Maronites also began appointing a Maronite patriarch. After the First Crusade, the Catholic Church began appointing a Latin Church patriarch of Antioch, though this became strictly titular after the Fall of Antioch in 1268, and was abolished completely in 1964. In the 18th century, succession disputes in the Greek Orthodox and Syriac Orthodox churches of Antioch led to factions of those churches entering into communion with Rome under claimants to the patriarchate: respectively the Melkite Greek Catholic patriarch of Antioch and the Syriac Catholic patriarch of Antioch. Their respective Orthodox progenitors are the Greek Orthodox patriarch of Antioch and the Syriac Orthodox patriarch of Antioch.

== History ==
=== First Christians ===
In Roman times, Antioch was the principal city of the Roman Province of Syria, and the fourth largest city of the Roman Empire, after Rome, Ephesus and Alexandria.

The church in Antioch was the first to be called "Christian," according to Acts. According to tradition, Saint Peter established the church in Antioch which was the first major Christian area before the 4th century and was the city's first bishop, before going to Rome to found the church there. Ignatius of Antioch (died c. 107), counted as the third bishop of the city, was a prominent apostolic father. By the fourth century, the bishop of Antioch had become the most senior bishop in a region covering modern-day eastern Turkey, Lebanon, Israel, Palestine, Syria, Jordan, Iraq, and Iran. His hierarchy served the largest number of Christians in the known world at that time. The synods of Antioch met at a basilica named for Julian the Martyr, whose relics it contained.

Despite being overshadowed in ecclesiastical authority by the patriarch of Constantinople in the later years of the Eastern Roman Empire, the Antiochene patriarch remained the most independent, powerful, and trusted of the eastern patriarchs. The Antiochene church was a centre of Christian learning, second only to Alexandria. In contrast to the Hellenistic-influenced Christology of Alexandria, Rome, and Constantinople, Antiochene theology was greatly influenced by Rabbinic Judaism and other modes of West Asian monotheistic thought—emphasizing the single, transcendent divine substance (οὐσία), which in turn led to adoptionism in certain extremes, and to the clear distinction of two natures of Christ (δύο φύσεις: dyophysitism): one human, the other divine. Lastly, compared to the patriarchates in Constantinople, Rome, and Alexandria which for various reasons became mired in the theology of imperial state religion, many of its patriarchs managed to straddle the divide between the controversies of Christology and imperial unity through its piety and straightforward grasp of early Christian thought which was rooted in its primitive Church beginnings.

=== Chalcedonian split ===
The Christological controversies that followed the Council of Chalcedon in 451 resulted in a long struggle for the patriarchate between those who accepted and those who rejected the council. The issue came to a head in 512, when a synod was convened in Sidon by the non-Chalcedonians, which resulted in Flavian II (a Chalcedonian) being replaced as patriarch by Severus (a non-Chalcedonian). The non-Chalcedonians under Severus eventually came to be called the Syriac Orthodox Church (which is a part of the Oriental Orthodox Churches), which has continued to appoint its own patriarchs of Antioch. The non-Chalcedonians were also the largest in contrast with the Chalcedonians in Antioch; and these Chalcedonians that refused to recognise the dismissal and continued to recognise Flavian as patriarch, formed a rival church. From 518, on the death of Flavian and the appointment of his successor, the Chalcedonian church became known as the Byzantines' (Rūm) Church of Antioch. In the Middle Ages, as the Byzantine Church of Antioch became more and more dependent on Constantinople, it began to use the Byzantine rite.

The internal schisms among Christians—such as issues with Christology, Julianism, Monothelitism, Monergism, and others—were followed by the Islamic conquests which began in the late 7th century, resulting in the patriarch's ecclesiastical authority becoming entangled in the politics of imperial authority and later Islamic hegemony. Being considered independent of both Byzantine and Arab Muslim power but in essence occupied by both, the de facto power of the Antiochene patriarchs faded. Additionally, the city of Antioch suffered several natural disasters including major earthquakes throughout the 4th and 6th centuries and anti-Christian conquests beginning with the Zoroastrian Persians in the 6th century, then the Muslim Arabs in the seventh century before the city could be recovered by the Byzantine Empire in 969.

=== Maronite split ===
Although some Syriac-speaking followers of the 4th-century hermit Saint Maron did accept the terms of Chalcedon, they adhered to Monothelitism (due to impossible communication with the wider Chalcedonian church and their attempt to synthesize the works of early Syriac Fathers with Chalcedonian language) until the 12th century through the establishment of communion with Rome. Although the Maronites initially fought alongside the Byzantines in their struggle against the Arabs, in 685 AD, they appointed a patriarch for themselves, John Maron, who became the first patriarch of the Maronite Church; however, the historical existence of John Maron is doubtful and largely relies on recent traditions of the Maronite Church itself.

=== Great Schism ===
Over the centuries, differences between the Christian Church in the East and West emerged such as the use of unleavened bread for the Eucharist in the West or the addition of the filioque to the Nicene Creed by Pope Sergius IV. The resulting schism, called the Great Schism, has often been dated to the 1054 mission of Cardinal Humbert to Constantinople when Humbert excommunicated the Patriarch of Constantinople, Michael I Cerularius, who in turn excommunicated the Pope of Rome and removed him from the diptychs. Consequently, two major Christian bodies broke communion and became two factions: One faction, now identified as the Catholic Church, represented the Latin West under the leadership of the pope; the other faction, now identified as the Eastern Orthodox Church, represented the Greek East under the collegial authority of the patriarchs of Antioch, Jerusalem, Constantinople and Alexandria. This split, however, was then most likely known only within higher clerics who either gave it little importance or expected it to be overcome soon.

As with the patriarchates of Alexandria and Jerusalem, communication between Rome and Antioch was not as easy as between Rome and Constantinople. Nevertheless, documentation between Antioch and Rome exist such as when in 1052 Patriarch Peter III of Antioch send news of his appointment to Leo IX and asked him to send a profession of faith back as the popes had not been commemorated in the diptychs for 30 years. After Michael I Cerularius had excommunicated the Latin Church in 1054, informed also Peter III whose reply shows the non-importance he and many others maintained toward the events of 1054; Peter maintained the Latins were their brothers but that their thinking was prone to error and that as barbarians they should be excused from a precise understanding of orthodoxy. In 1085, the city was captured by Sultanate of Rum but it was allowed that John the Oxite, the newly appointed patriarch by emperor Alexios I Komnenos could live in the city. When the army of the First Crusade appeared before the walls of Antioch, John was imprisoned by the city's governor and subject to torture in front of the eyes of the crusaders. After the conquest of the city in June 1098, John was released and reinstated by the spiritual leader of the crusader, Adhemar of Le Puy, as patriarch of Antioch. After Adhemar's death, the Norman Bohemond of Taranto established himself as prince of Antioch and went in opposition to Alexios I in 1099/1100, forcing John to leave the patriarchate due to his suspected loyalty to the Byzantine Emperor. Bohemond selected a Frankish cleric loyal to him as new patriarch, thus starting the Latin Patriarchate of Antioch.

The Western influence in the area was finally ended by the victories of the Muslim Mamluks over the Crusader States in the 13th century. In 1268 the Principality of Antioch came to an end with the brutal conquest of the city by Mamluks which left the significance of the patriarchate, together with the ecclesiastical schisms between Rome and Constantinople and between Constantinople and Alexandria and Antioch, isolated, fractured and debased. The Latin patriarch went into exile in 1268, and the office became titular only. The office fell vacant in 1953 and was finally abolished in 1964.

=== Syriac Catholic schism ===
In Aleppo, the efforts of Jesuit and Capuchin missionaries led some members of the local Syriac Orthodox community to create a pro-Roman faction within their church. In 1667, Andrew Akijan was elected as patriarch, resulting in a schism. After Akijan's death in 1677, two rival patriarchs emerged, one of whom was Akijan's uncle. Until 1782, Syriac Catholics had no patriarch, until the Syriac Orthodox Holy Synod, composed of Catholic-leaning members at the time, appointed Metropolitan Michael Jarweh of Aleppo as patriarch, who immediately proclaimed his allegiance to the Catholic Church, and brought many members of the Orthodox faithful into communion with Rome. This pivotal decision established the leadership of the Syriac Catholic Church, known as the Ignatius Line, which has remained continuous since Jarweh's time.

=== Melkite split of 1724 ===
In 1724, Cyril VI was elected Greek patriarch of Antioch. He was viewed as pro-Rome by the patriarch of Constantinople, who refused to recognize the election and appointed another patriarch in his stead. Many Melkites continued to acknowledge Cyril's claim to the patriarchate. Thus, from 1724, the Greek Church of Antioch divided into the Greek Orthodox Church of Antioch and the Melkite Greek Catholic Church. In 1729, Pope Benedict XIII recognized Cyril as the Eastern Catholic patriarch of Antioch and welcomed him and his followers into full communion with the Catholic Church.

== Current patriarchs ==
Today, five churches claim the title of patriarch of Antioch; three of these are autonomous Eastern Catholic particular churches in full communion with the Pope. All five see themselves as part of the Antiochene heritage and claim a right to the Antiochene See through apostolic succession, although none are currently based in the city of Antakya. The presence of multiple patriarchs of Antioch, along with their absence from the city itself, highlights the tumultuous history of Christianity in the region. This history has been characterized by internal conflicts and persecution, especially following the Islamic conquest. As a result, the original Christian population in the territories of the Antiochene patriarchs has been nearly eradicated through assimilation and expulsion, leaving the current Christian community as a small minority.

The current patriarchs of Antioch are listed below in order of their accession to the post, from earliest to most recent.

- Ignatius Aphrem II, Syriac Orthodox Patriarch of Antioch. He is the Supreme Head of the Syriac Orthodox Church, an Oriental Orthodox Church that uses the West Syriac Rite. His see is based in Damascus, Syria.
- John X of Antioch, Greek Orthodox Patriarch of Antioch. He is the Supreme Head of the Greek Orthodox Church of Antioch, one of the four ancient patriarchates of the Eastern Orthodox Church that uses the Byzantine Rite. His see is based in Damascus, Syria.
- Ignatius Joseph III Yonan, Syriac Catholic Patriarch of Antioch. He is the Supreme Head of the Syriac Catholic Church, an Eastern Rite Catholic Church that is in full communion with the Catholic Church and uses the West Syriac Rite. The see is based in Beirut, Lebanon.
- Bechara Boutros Rahi, Maronite Patriarch of Antioch. He is the Supreme Head of the Syriac Maronite Church an Eastern Rite Catholic Church that is in full communion with the Catholic Church and uses the West Syriac Rite. His see is based in Bkerké, Lebanon.
- Youssef Absi, Melkite Catholic Patriarch of Antioch. He is the Supreme Head of the Melkite Greek Catholic Church, an Eastern Rite Catholic Church that is in full communion with the Catholic Church and uses the Byzantine Rite. His see is based in Damascus, Syria.

At one point, there was at least nominally a sixth claimant to the Patriarchate. When the Western European Crusaders established the Principality of Antioch, they established a Latin Church in the city, whose head took the title of Patriarch. After the Crusaders were expelled by the Mamluks in 1268, the pope continued to appoint a titular Latin patriarch of Antioch, whose actual seat was the Basilica di Santa Maria Maggiore in Rome. The last holder of this office was Roberto Vicentini, who died without a successor in 1953. The post itself was abolished in 1964.

== Episcopal succession ==
One way to understand the historical interrelationships among the various churches is to examine their chain of episcopal succession—that is, the sequence of bishops each church recognizes as the predecessors of its current claimant to the patriarchate. There are four key moments in history when a disputed succession to the patriarchate resulted in a lasting institutional schism, leading to the five churches that exist today.

- All five churches recognize a single sequence of bishops until 518. In that year, Severus, who rejected the Council of Chalcedon, was deposed by the Byzantine Emperor Justin I and replaced by the Chalcedonian Paul the Jew, but Severus and his followers did not recognize his deposition. This led to two rival sequences of patriarchs: Severus and his successors, recognized by the Syriac Orthodox Church; and Paul and his successors, recognized by the Greek, Melkite, and Maronite Churches today. While the successors of Paul were recognized as legitimate by the Byzantine government, they were not accepted by the majority of the East at that time.
- In 685, John Maron, who recognized the legitimacy of Paul the Jew and his successors until Byzantium began to appoint titular patriarchs of Antioch ending with Theophanes (681–687), was elected Patriarch of Antioch by the Maradite army. Byzantine Emperor Justinian II sent an army to dislodge John from the see; John and his followers retreated to Lebanon, where they formed the Maronite Church, whose succession of patriarchs have continued to the present day. The Byzantines appointed Theophanes of Antioch in his stead. Thus, there were now three rival patriarchs: those that recognized Severus and his successors, those that recognized John Maron and his successors, and those that recognized Theophanes and his successors. It was the successors of Theophanes who were recognized as legitimate by the Byzantine government.
- In 1724, the church that recognized Theophanes and his successors elected Cyril VI Tanas, who supported re-establishing communion with the Catholic Church that had been broken in the Great Schism, as patriarch of Antioch. However, the Ecumenical Patriarch declared Cyril's election invalid, and appointed Sylvester of Antioch in his stead. Cyril and Sylvester both had followers, and both continued to claim the patriarchate. The Melkite Greek Catholic Church recognizes Cyril and his successors; the Greek Orthodox Church of Antioch recognizes Sylvester and his successors.
- In 1783, a faction within the church that recognized Severus and his successors elected Ignatius Michael III Jarweh, a bishop who was already in communion with the Catholic Church, as patriarch of Antioch. Shortly thereafter, another faction, who rejected communion with Rome, elected Ignatius Matthew. Both had followers, and both continued to claim the patriarchate. The Syriac Orthodox Church recognizes Ignatius Mathew and his successors; the Syriac Catholic Church recognizes Ignatius Michael and his successors.

Thus, the succession recognized by each church is as follows:

- The Syriac Orthodox Church recognizes the succession from the Apostle Peter to Severus, then recognizes Sergius of Tella as Severus's successor in 544, then recognizes Sergius's successors down to Ignatius George IV, then recognizes Ignatius Matthew as Ignatius George's successor in 1783, then recognizes Ignatius Matthew's successors down to Ignatius Aphrem II today.
- The Greek Orthodox Church of Antioch recognizes the succession from the Apostle Peter to Severus, then recognizes that Severus was deposed in favor of Paul the Jew in 519, then recognizes Paul the Jew's successors down to Athanasius III Dabbas, then recognizes Sylvester of Antioch as Athanasius III's successor in 1724, then recognizes Sylvester's successors down to John X today.
- The Maronite Church recognizes the succession from the Apostle Peter to Severus, then recognizes that Severus was deposed in favor of Paul the Jew in 518, then recognizes Paul the Jew's successors until Byzantium began appointing titular patriarchs of Antioch ending with Theophanes (681–687), at which point they recognize the election of John Maron, then recognize John's successors down to Bechara Boutros al-Rahi today.
- The Melkite Greek Catholic Church recognizes the succession from the Apostle Peter to Severus, then recognizes that Severus was deposed in favor of Paul the Jew in 518, then recognizes Paul the Jew's successors down to Peter III of Antioch, then recognizes Cyril VI Tanas as Peter III's successor in 1724, then recognizes Cyril VI's successors down to Youssef Absi today.
- The Syriac Catholic Church recognizes the succession from the Apostle Peter to Severus, then recognizes Ignatius Michael III Jarweh as Severus's successor in 1783, then recognizes Ignatius Michael III's successors down to Ignatius Joseph III Yonan today.

== Lists of patriarchs of Antioch ==
- List of patriarchs of Antioch, 37–518
- List of Syriac Orthodox patriarchs of Antioch, 512–present
- List of Syriac Catholic patriarchs of Antioch, 1662–present
- List of Greek Orthodox patriarchs of Antioch, 518–present
- List of Melkite Catholic patriarchs of Antioch, 1724–present
- List of Maronite patriarchs of Antioch, 686–present
- List of Latin patriarchs of Antioch, 1098–1964

== See also ==
- Melkite Greek Catholic Church
- Greek Orthodox Church of Antioch
- Syriac Orthodox Church
- Syriac Catholic Church
- Syriac Orthodox Patriarch of Antioch and All the East

== Sources ==
- Grillmeier, Aloys; Hainthaler, Theresia (2013). Christ in Christian Tradition: The Churches of Jerusalem and Antioch from 451 to 600. Vol. 2/3. Oxford: Oxford University Press. ISBN 978-0-19-921288-0.
