= Basilian Chouerite Order of Saint John the Baptist =

Melkite Greek Catholic monastic order

- Ordo Basilianus Sancti Iohannis Baptistæ (Latin)
- Abbreviation: B.C. (post-nominal letters)
- Formation: 1697; 329 years ago
- Founder: Neophytos Nasri
- Type: Monastic Order of Pontifical Right (for Men)
- Headquarters: Couvent Saint-Jean, Khonchara, B.P. 188, Bikfaya, Lebanon
- Members: 45 members (36 priests) as of 2018
- Superior General: Archimandrite Elie Maalouf, B.C.
- Parent organization: Melkite Greek Catholic Church of the Byzantine Tradition

The Basilian Chouerite Order of Saint John the Baptist (Latin: Ordo Basilianus Sancti Iohannis Baptistæ) is a Melkite Greek Catholic monastic order of pontifical right for men. Order members add the nominal B.C after their names to indicate their membership in the Order.

== History ==
The order was founded in 1696 by five monks (including Neophytos Nasri) who left the Balamand Monastery to look for a quiet place where to better follow the rule of Saint Basil. They settled in 1710 in the village of Choueir (or Dhour El Shuwayr, near Khinchara) in Mount Lebanon using the little church of Saint John the Baptist, from which they took the name and that is still their motherhouse (33.921575°N 35.732780°E).

In 1733 Abdallah Zakher set up an Arabic language printing press using movable type at the monastery of Saint John at Choueir, the first home made press in Lebanon. In 1757 Pope Benedict XIV approved their particular rules, and the final approval from Rome was given in 1772.

The Basilian Chouerite Order soon became one of the two main religious orders of the Melkite Catholic Church. The other order was the Basilian Salvatorian Order. According to their tradition, the Basilian Salvatorian Order had a more missionary aim, while the Basilian Chouerite Order was more contemplative. The Basilian Salvatorian Order recruited in the areas of Damascus and South Lebanon, while the Basilian Chouerite Order recruited in the areas of Aleppo, Homs, North Lebanon and Galilee. Attempts to unite these two orders from 1736 to 1768 failed: the opposition between them and between the different communities from which they recruit members is an important aspect to understand in the early history of the Melkite Catholic Church.

Between 1824 and 1832 the order split into two branches: the Basilian Aleppian Order (formed mainly by monks who came from Aleppo area), and Baladites or Basilian Chouerite Order (who came mainly from Lebanon and Galilee). The order founded its seminary in 1880 and run many parishes in the Middle East. Three Melkite Patriarchs and about 36 bishops were members of the Basilian Chouerites.

The female branch of the order; the congregation of Basilian Chouerite Sisters, was founded in 1737 and approved in 1763 by Pope Clement XIII. The first house of this congregation was the Monastery of the Annunciation at Zouk Mikael.

== See also ==
=== Maronite Religious Institutes (Orders) ===
- Baladites
- Antonins
- Aleppians
- Kreimists, Congregation of the Maronite Lebanese Missionaries

=== Melkite Religious Institutes (Orders) ===
- Basilian Salvatorian Order
- Basilian Aleppian Order
