= Georges Iskandar =

Lebanese Melkite Greek Catholic archbishop (born 1968)

His Eminence Georges Iskandar, BS
- Archbishop of Tyre
- Church: Melkite Greek Catholic Church
- Archdiocese: Tyre
- Appointed: 20 August 2022
- Predecessor: Michel Abrass
- Successor: Incumbent

Orders
- Ordination: 11 July 1998
- Consecration: 8 October 2022 by Youssef Absi, Elie Bechara Haddad and Ibrahim Ibrahim

Personal details
- Born: Georges Iskandar; 4 February 1968 (age 58) Ain al-Mir, Lebanon
- Education: Holy Spirit University of Kaslik, Saint Paul University

Georges Iskandar BS (born 4 February 1968) is a Lebanese Melkite Catholic hierarch, who has served as the Archbishop of Tyre since his appointment in August 2022.

== Biography ==
=== Early life and education ===
Georges Iskandar was born on 4 February 1968 in Ain al-Mir, a village in the Jezzine District of South Lebanon. He entered the Basilian Salvatorian Order on 18 September 1992 and made his solemn profession of vows on 21 November 1997.

After completed his secondary education, he subsequently studied philosophy and theology at the Holy Spirit University of Kaslik (USEK), obtaining a licence degree in Theology. Between 2000 and 2003 he studied at the Saint Paul University in Ottawa, Canada, and obtained a licentiate in a canon law.

=== Priesthood ===
Iskandar was ordained a priest on 11 July 1998 for the Basilian Salvatorian Order Following his ordination he held several pastoral educational and administrative positions within his order and local dioceses including serving as rector of the minor seminary of the Basilian Salvatorian Order in Joun from 1998 to 2003 He also worked as chaplain and director of the boarding school of the Holy Savior in Sidon Saida between 1999 and 2006 During this period he was parish priest of several Melkite parishes including Saint Elie in Kfar Jerra from 2000 to 2004 and Our Lady of the Dormition in Salhiyeh from 2004 to 2006 He later served as parish priest of Saint Elijah in Zahlé from 2007 to 2019 Additionally he acted as Judicial Vicar and President of the Unified Patriarchal Ecclesiastical Court of First Instance in Lebanon

=== Episcopate ===
On 20 August 2022, Pope Francis assented to his election by the Synod of Bishops of the Melkite Greek Catholic Church as the Archbishop of Tyre, succeeding Michel Abrass. He was consecrated as a bishop on 8 October 2022 by Patriarch Youssef Absi, assisted by co-consecrators Archbishop Elie Bechara Haddad and Archbishop Ibrahim Ibrahim.

During the 2026 conflict affecting southern Lebanon, Archbishop Iskandar remained in Tyre to support the local civilian population, providing shelter and humanitarian aid to displaced families at the archdiocese's headquarters despite active shelling in the region.
