= Melkite Greek Catholic Archeparchy of Tyre =

Eastern Catholic eparchy in Lebanon

Coordinates: 33.273449°N 35.193789°E

Archeparchy of Tyre (Melkite Greek) Archeparchy Tyrensis Graecorum Melkitarum
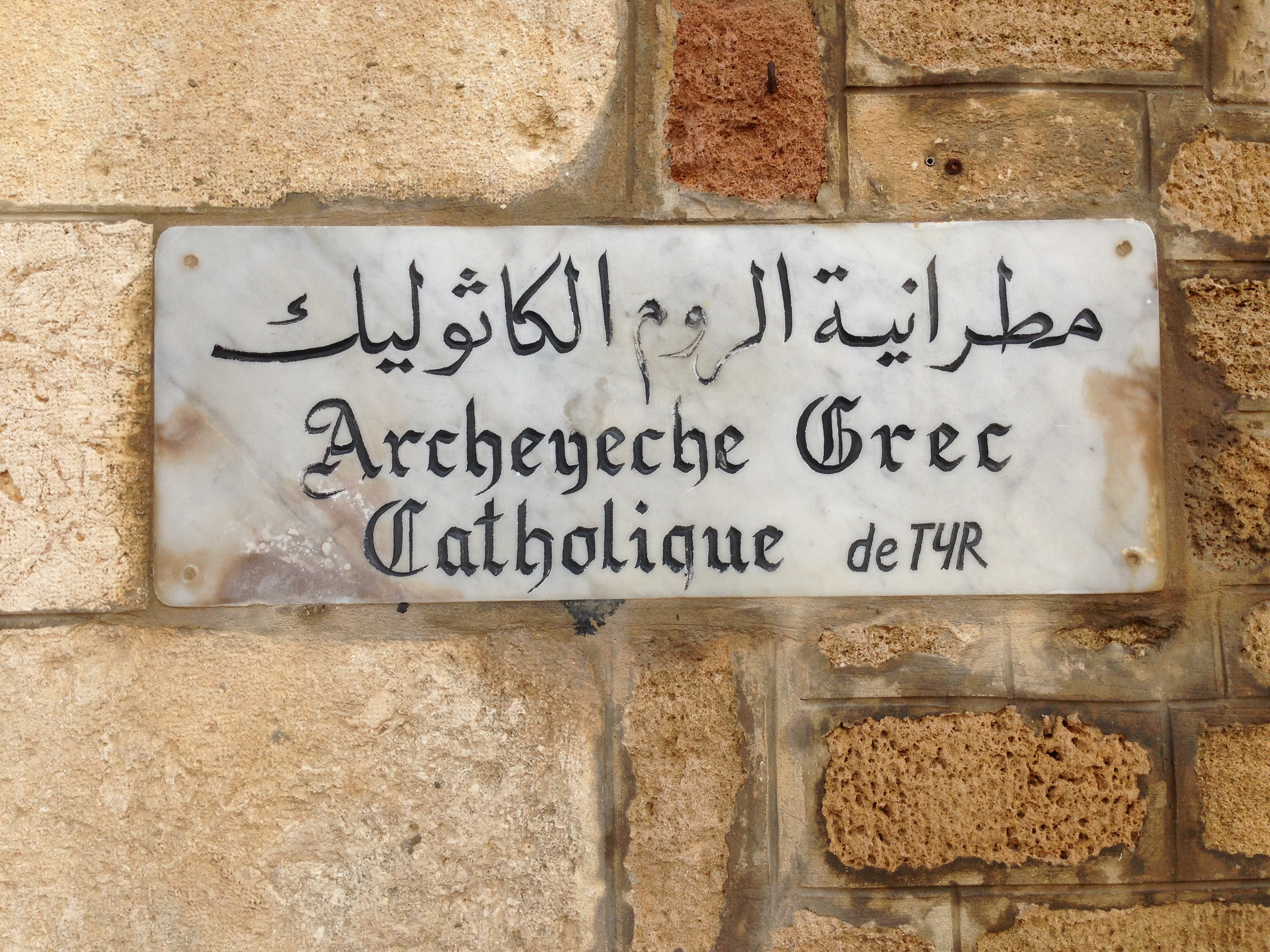
- Melkite Greek Catholic Archeparchy of Tyre, South Lebanon

Location
- Country: Lebanon
- Headquarters: Tyre/Sour

Statistics
- Population: (as of 2017); 2,857
- Parishes: 10
- Churches: 10

Information
- Denomination: Melkite Greek Catholic Church
- Rite: Byzantine Rite
- Established: 1683
- Cathedral: Saint Thomas Cathedral

Current leadership
- Pope: Leo XIV
- Patriarch: Youssef Absi
- Archeparch: Georges Iskandar, B.S.
- Bishops emeritus: Michel Abrass

Melkite Greek Catholic Archeparchy of Tyre (Latin: Archeparchy Tyrensis Graecorum Melkitarum) is a metropolitan see of the Melkite Greek Catholic Church. In 2009 there were 3,100 baptized. It is currently governed by an Apostolic Administrator, Archbishop Elie Bechara Haddad, B.S., because of the 31 January 2021 removal of Archeparch Michael Abrass, BA.

== Territory and statistics ==
The archeparchy includes the southwestern part of Lebanon, corresponding to the District of Tyre in the South Governorate and neighbouring areas in the Nabatieh Governorate, altogether some 1,500 km^{2}. Its archeparchial seat is the city of Tyre with the Cathedral of Saint Thomas. In 2011, the territory was divided into twelve parishes:

- St. Thomas, Our Lady of the Annunciation, and Holy Christine in the city of Tyre itself,

- Saint Joseph in Qana, Saint-Élie in Alma Chaab, and Saint Thomas in Nafakhiye, in the Tyre District,

- Our Lady of the Assumption in Safad El Battikh, Saint-Georges in Yaroun, Our Lady of the Assumption in Baraachit, Saint-Georges in Tebnine, and Saint-Élie in Aïn Ebel, in the Nabatieh Governorate

and Saint-Georges in Deir Deghaia (unidentified district).

In Yaroun, the Melkite nuns of the Sœurs Basiliennes Salvatoriennes have been running a primary school, as well as a health care center in cooperation with the Order of Malta. Tebnine has been housing a school by the Melkite nuns of the Sœurs Basiliennes Choueirites since 1995, which was expanded to become a secondary school after 2006.

By 2017, the number of parishes was down to ten, though it had been as low as eight already in 1981 and nine from 1991 to 2005. Some of these changes in numbers may have been due to changes of administrative boundaries though. However, they are obviously also a consequence of falling membership figures:

From 1950 to 2005, the number of registered followers fluctuated between 6,000 and 9,000, yet after the July 2006 Israel-Hezbollah War, the community membership soon dropped to just above 3,000. By 2017, it further diminished to 2,857.

== History ==
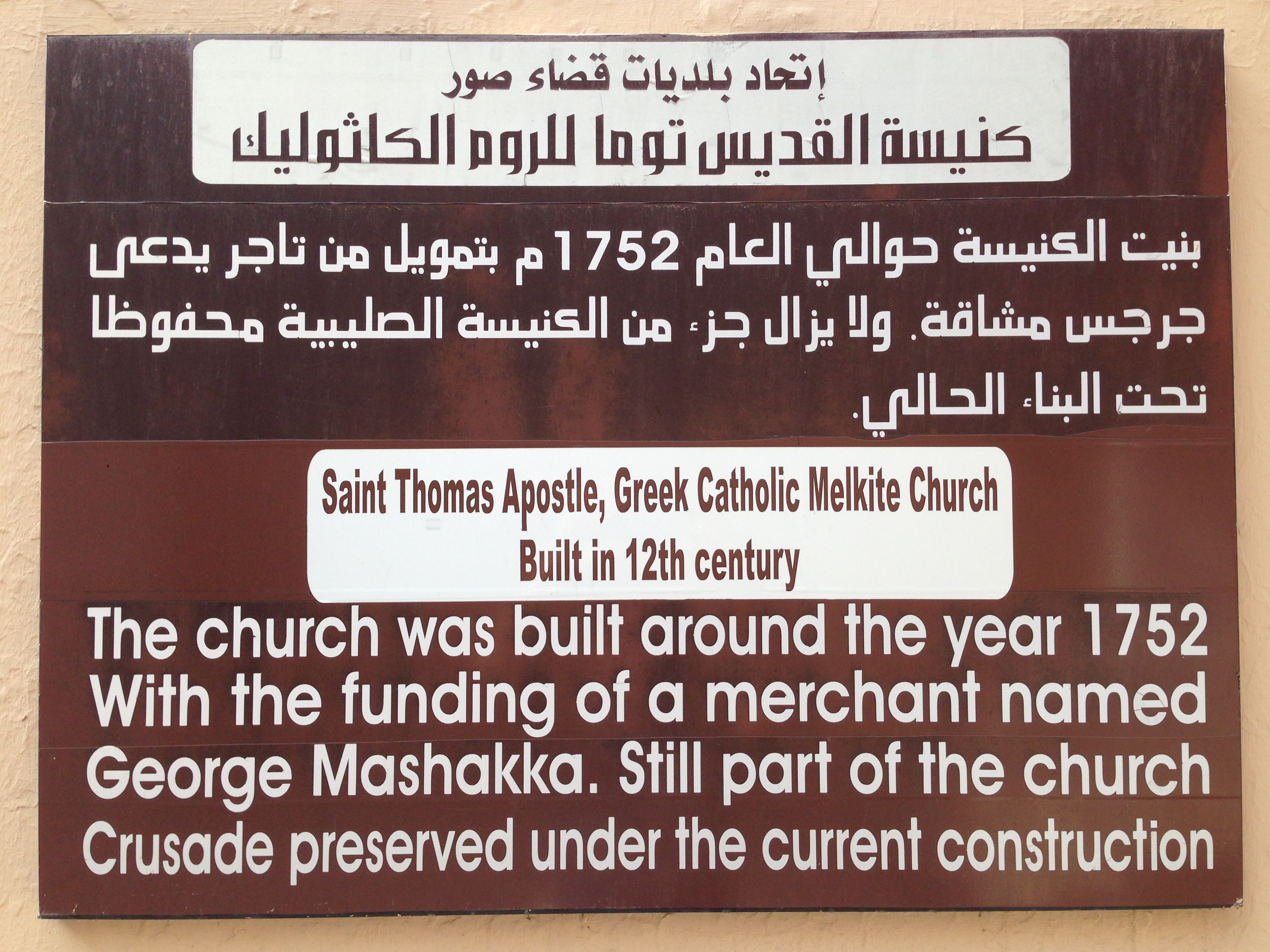
Information sign at St. Thomas

The historical origin of the archeparchy is traced back to the New Testament. In Acts of Apostles, the church of Tyre (also Tyros) is mentioned in the missionary journey of Paul the Apostle "From Miletus about Caesarea to Jerusalem" (Acts 21.3 to 7 EU). Tyre was an ancient metropolitan see in Roman and Byzantine Empire. During the Crusades an archdiocese of the Latin rite was erected . The Roman Catholic Church built around 1124 the Archdiocese of Tyre, the territory encompassed the city and region of Tyre. Since Tyre was conquered in 1291 by the Muslim Mamluks, the archdiocese became titular.

When tensions within the Melkite Patriarchy escalated at the turn from the 17th to the 18th century, Tyre was at the center of the schism: its archbishop Euthymios Saifi had been working on regaining communion with the Holy See in Rome at least since 1683, when he founded the monastery Deir el Moukhallès near Sidon/Saida. In 1701, by secret decree he was appointed by the Congregation Propaganda Fide to be the Apostolic Administrator of the Melkites.

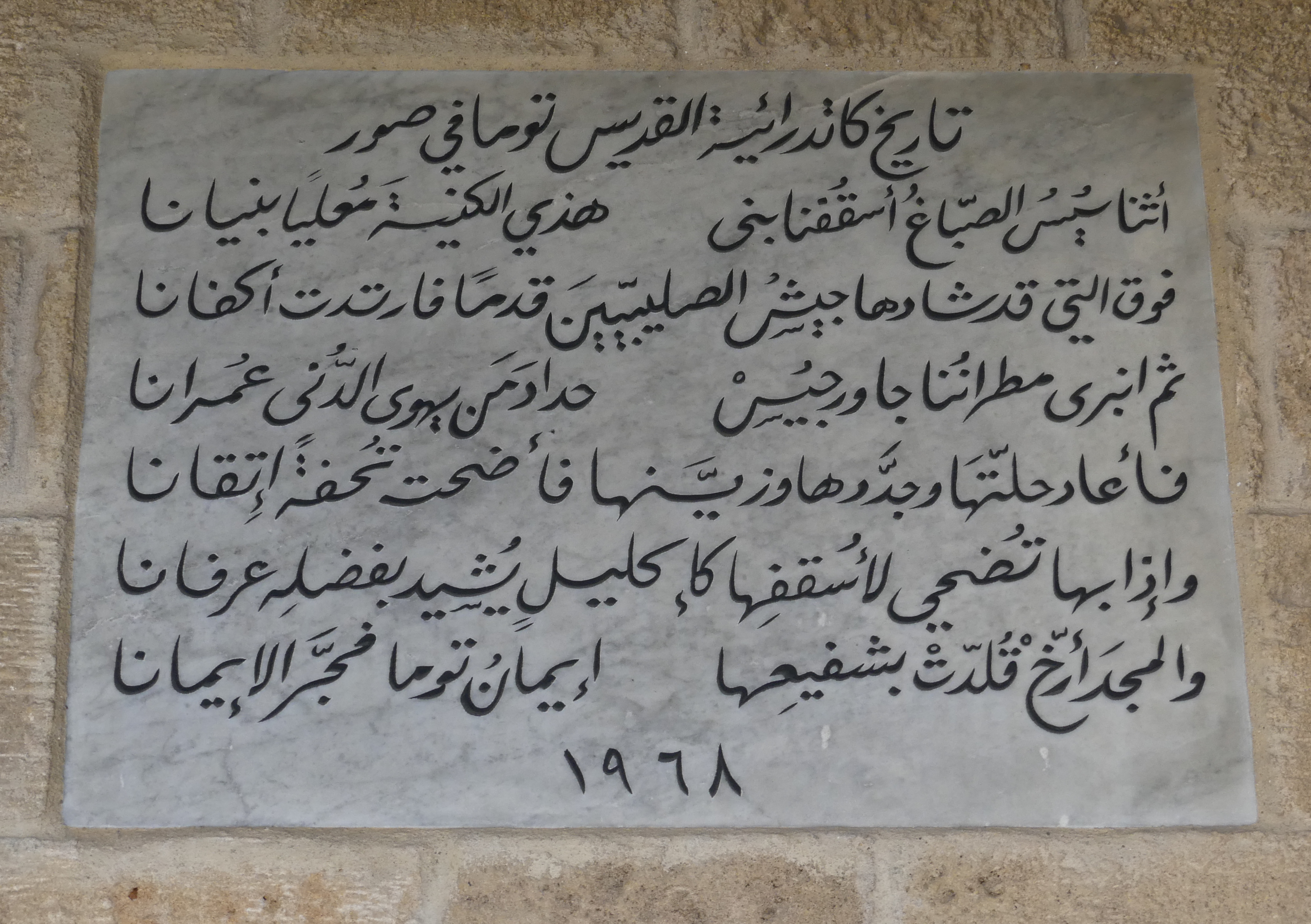
1968 plaque at Saint Thomas commemorating Haddad's efforts, that translates: "History of St. Thomas Cathedral in Tyre: Athanasius Al-Sabbagh, our bishop, built this church with a high edifice. Above which I led the Crusader army forward, and our shrouds were worn out, then rain rose. We are neighbors of the blacksmith of the one who loves the world, Imran our bishop, and the surgeons were decorated with their intercessor, Iman Thomas, the dawn of faith. He restored her clothes, found her, and decorated her, and she became a masterpiece of perfection. And behold, her bishop became like a crown praising his favor in gratitude. 1968"

In 1724, one year after Saifi's death, his nephew Seraphim Tanas, who had studied in Deir el Moukhallès, was elected as Patriarch Cyril VI of Antioch. He quickly affirmed the union with Rome and thereby the separation from the Greek Orthodox Church, which was officially recognised by the Vatican five years later.

Initially the Archeparchy of Tyre was united with the seats of Sidon and Akka; it later ceded portions of territory for the Melkite Greek Catholic Archeparchy of Sidon in 1752 and Melkite Greek Catholic Archeparchy of Akka in 1759.

The Melkite Cathedral of Saint Thomas was built in 1752 and features a facade of Gothic arches. It is situated next to the offices of the Archeparchy and the residence of the Archeparch. During excavations underneath the cathedral remains of the original church from the 12th century were discovered and preserved.

In the ten years before the outbreak of the Lebanese Civil War (1975-1990), Bishop Georges Haddad developed close relations with the Shia leader Sayyed Musa Sadr. He also had a new seat of the archeparchy constructed and the historical Cathedral of Saint Thomas repaired.

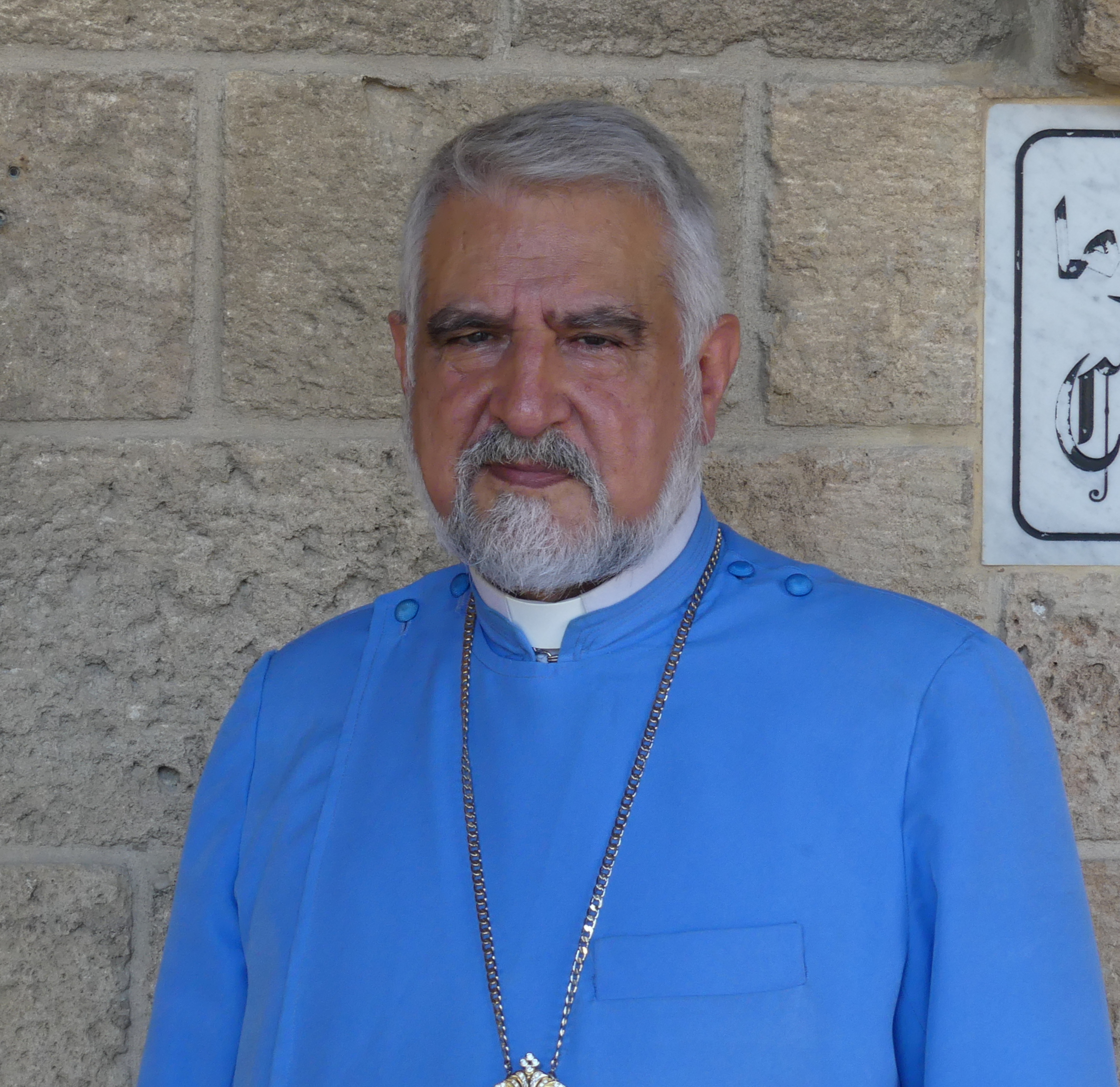
Archbishop Abrass in 2019

During the 1982 Lebanon War, on 7 June, Haddad reportedly succeeded in halting a tank attack by the invading Israeli Defense Forces (IDF) single-handedly in a bold appeal to the IDF commander in order to avoid civilian casualties.

During the 2006 Lebanon War between Israel and Hezbollah, the Saint Thomas Cathedral apparently provided safe shelter to many civilians, as illustrated in the graphic novel drama Yallah Bye by the Franco-Lebanese writer Joseph Safieddine and South Korean comics creator Kyungeun Park. Following the war, many community members moved elsewhere, especially to Australia and Canada, as well as to the national capital Beirut. While the Archeparchy still counted a flock of some 7,000 in 2005, this number had more than halved to less than 3,000 by 2017.

Nevertheless, the Waqf as the financial endowment of the Archeparchy, which owns land and other property holdings, is still one of the main non-governmental stakeholders in the informal governance of Tyre.

== Eparchs ==
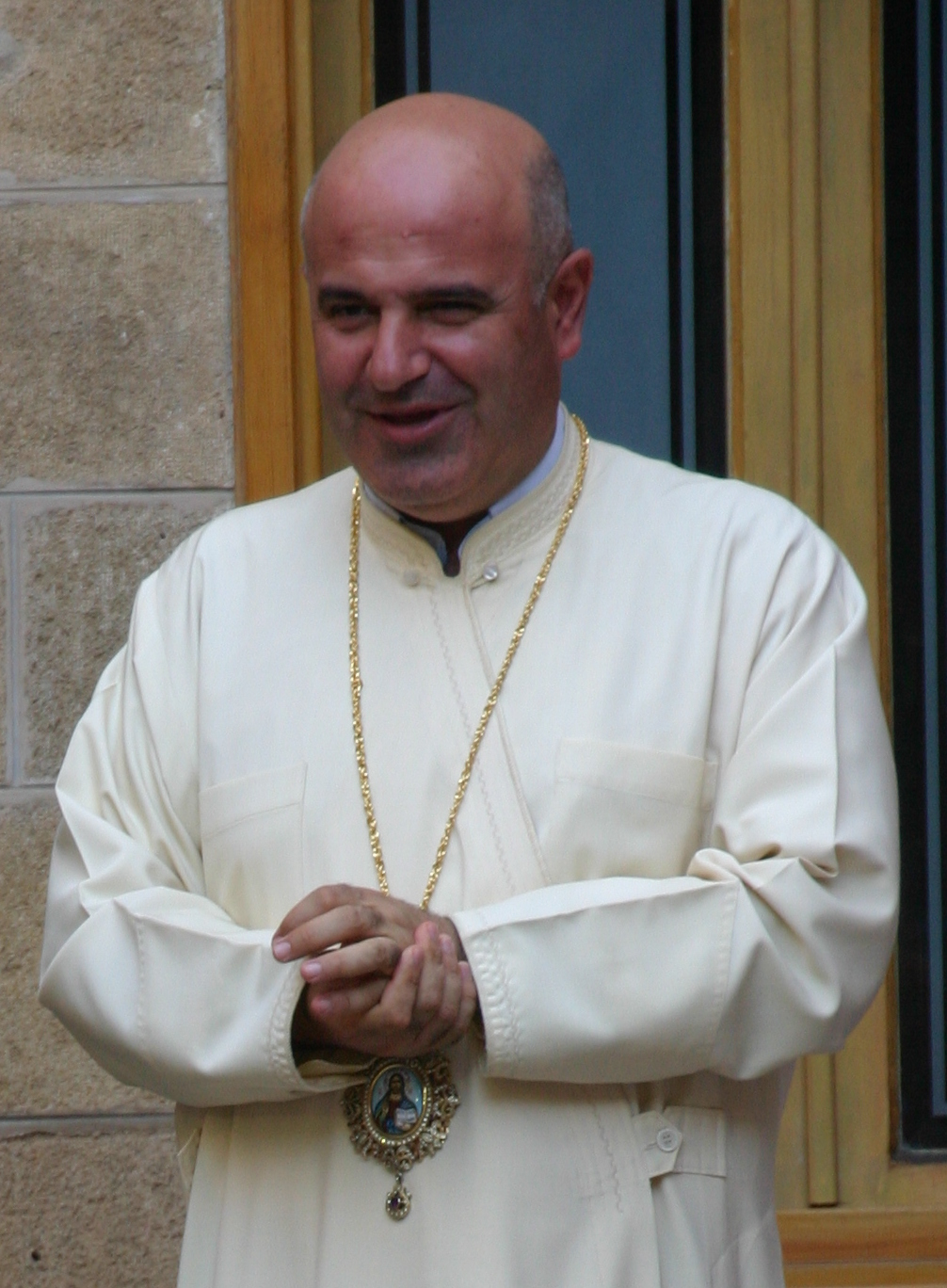
- Mgr. Georges Bacouni (2012)
  Euthymios Michael Saifi (1683 - 27 November 1723 deceased)
- Ignatius El Beyrouthy (1724 - 1752 resigned)
- Andrée Fakhoury (1752 - 1764)
- Parthenios Naameh (1766 - 1805)
- Basil Attalah (1806 - 1809)
- Cyrille Khabbaz (31 July 1810 - 1819 or 1826)
- Basil Zakar (1827 - 1834)
- Ignatius Karouth, B.S. (1837 - 1854)
- Athanasius Sabbagh (1855 - 1866)
- Athanasius Khawam, B.S. (14 April 1867 - 1886)
- Euthymius Zulhof, B.S. (13 June 1886 - 28 November 1913 deceased)
- Vacant (1913-1919), with Raphaël Abou-Mourad as interim replacement
- Amine Rizkallah Saigh, S.M.S.P. (30 August 1919 ordained bishop - 30 August 1933 appointed arcieparca of Beirut and Byblos)
- Agapios Salomon Naoum, B.S. (3 November 1933 - 15 October 1965 withdrawn)
- Georges Haddad (30 July 1965 - 31 December 1985 deceased)
- Vacant (1985-1988), with Father Paul Samaha 1986-87 and retired Beirut Archbishop Grégoire Haddad 1987-88 serving as temporary replacements
- Jean Assaad Haddad (26 October 1988 - 20 June 2005 withdrawn)
- Georges Bacouni (20 October 2005 - 21 June 2014 appointed arcieparca Akka)
- Michael Abrass, B.A. (21 June 2014 – 31 January 2021)
  - Elie Bechara Haddad, B.S. (31 January 2021 – 20 August 2022), Archbishop of Tyre, Apostolic Administrator
- Georges Iskandar, B.S. (since 20 August 2022)

== Galleries ==
=== Saint Thomas Cathedral in Tyre ===
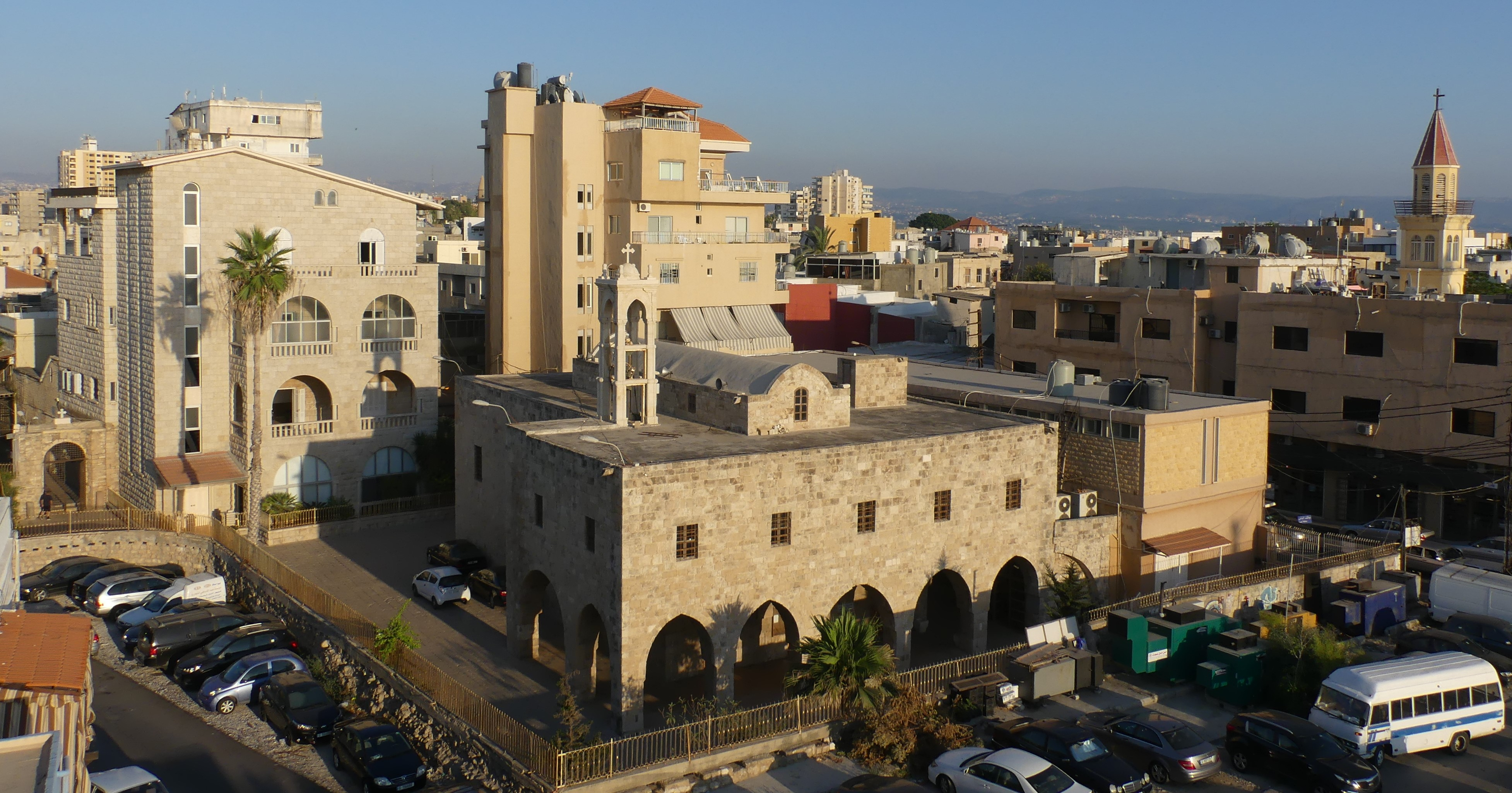

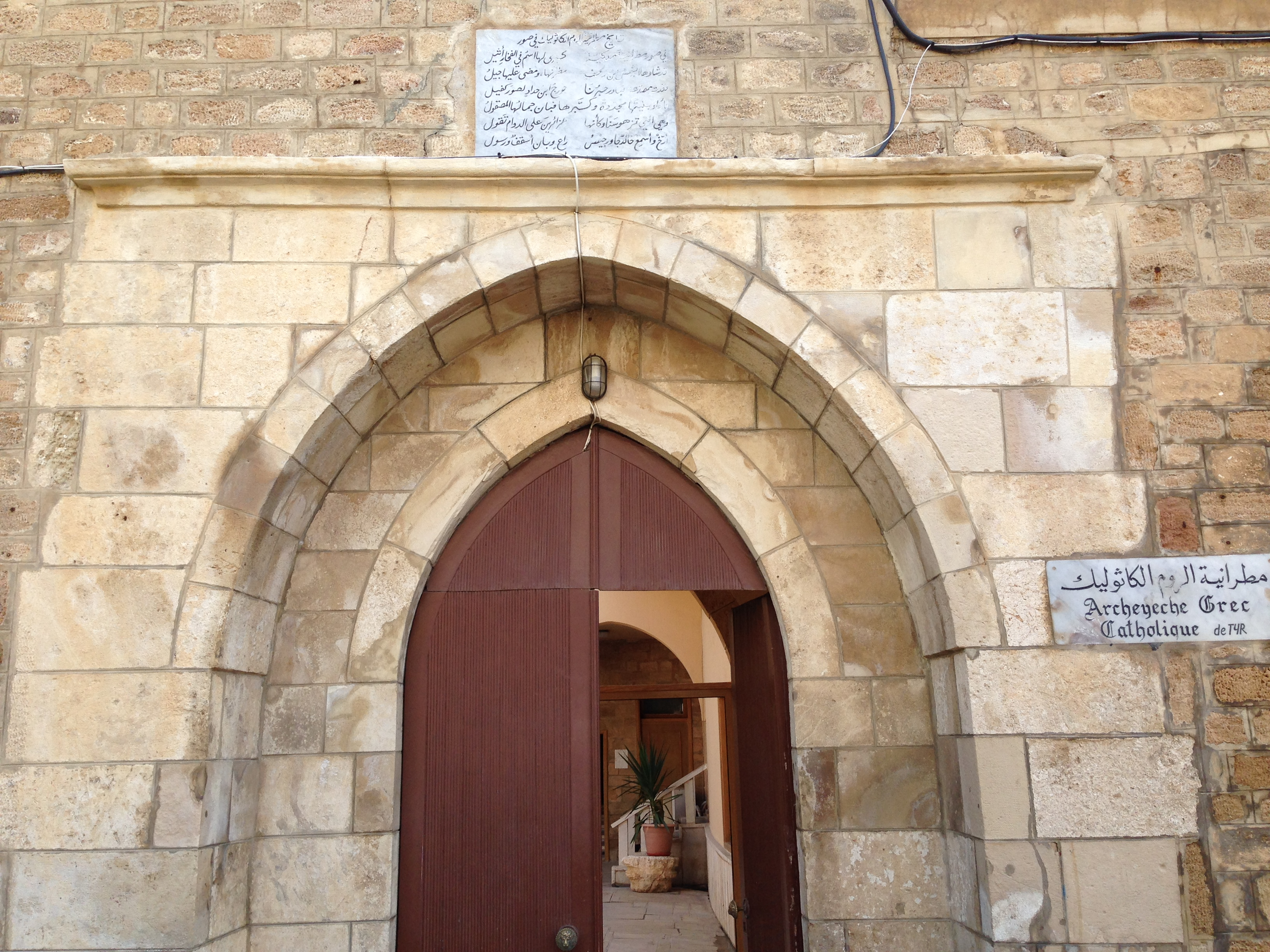

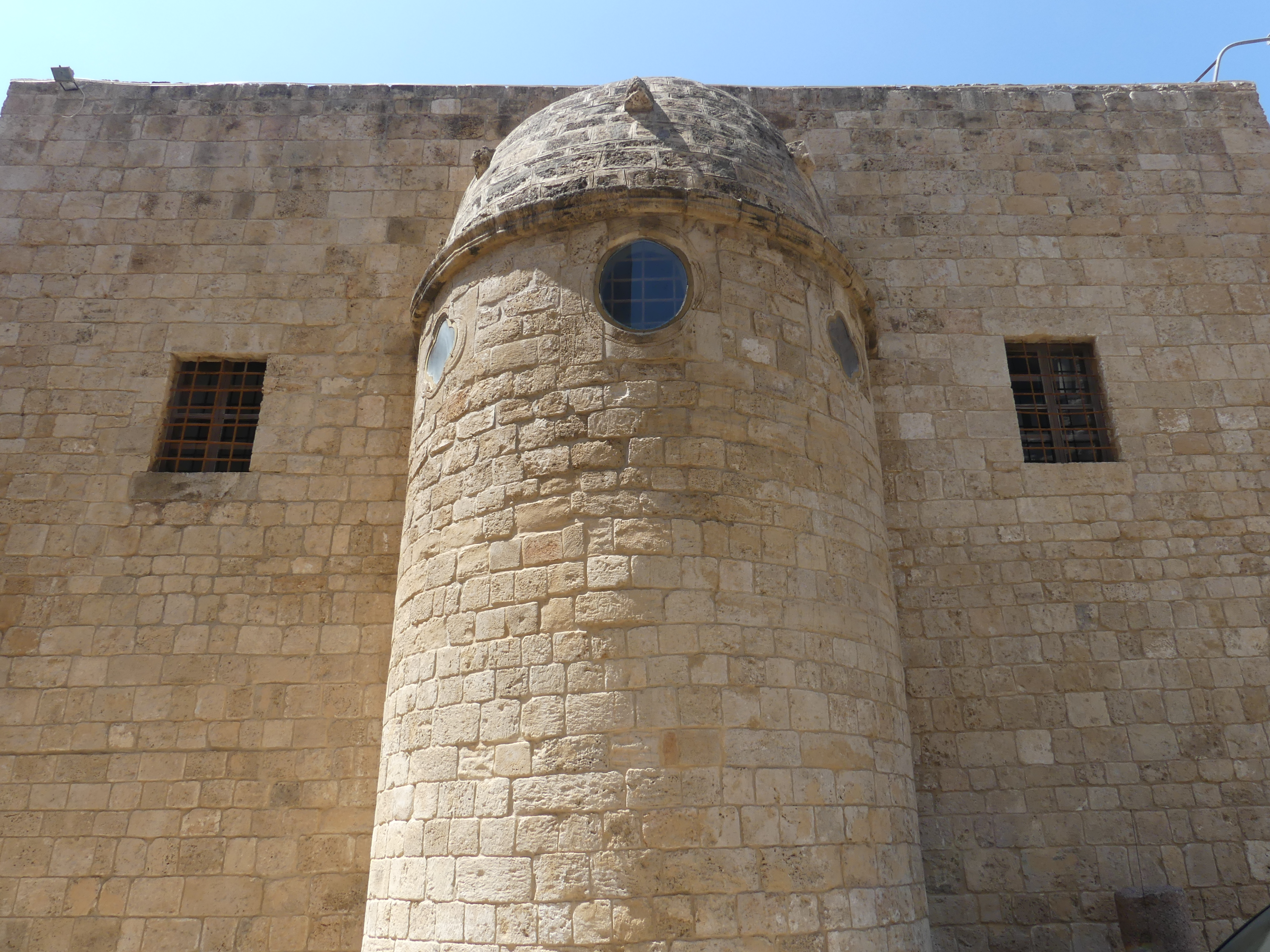

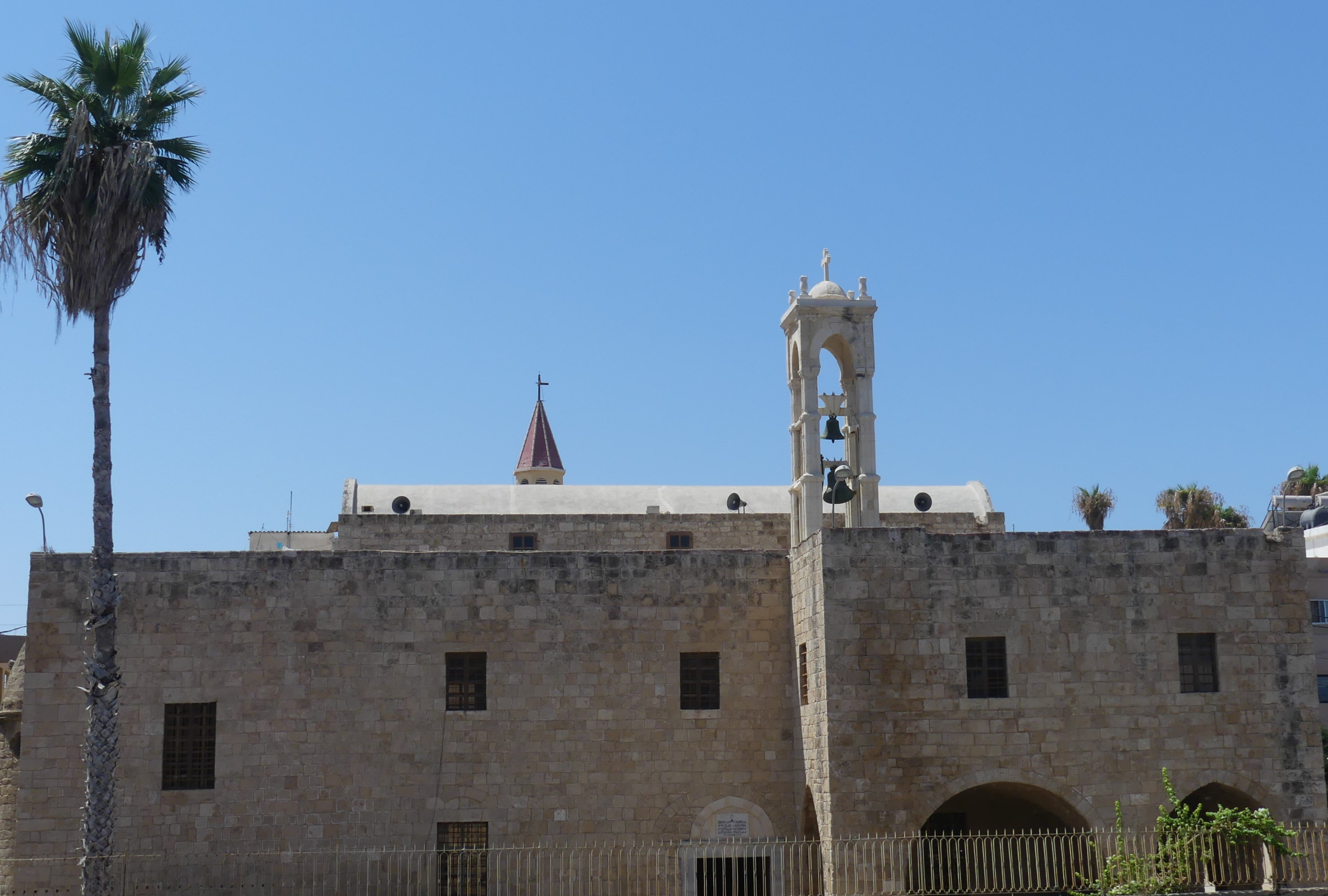

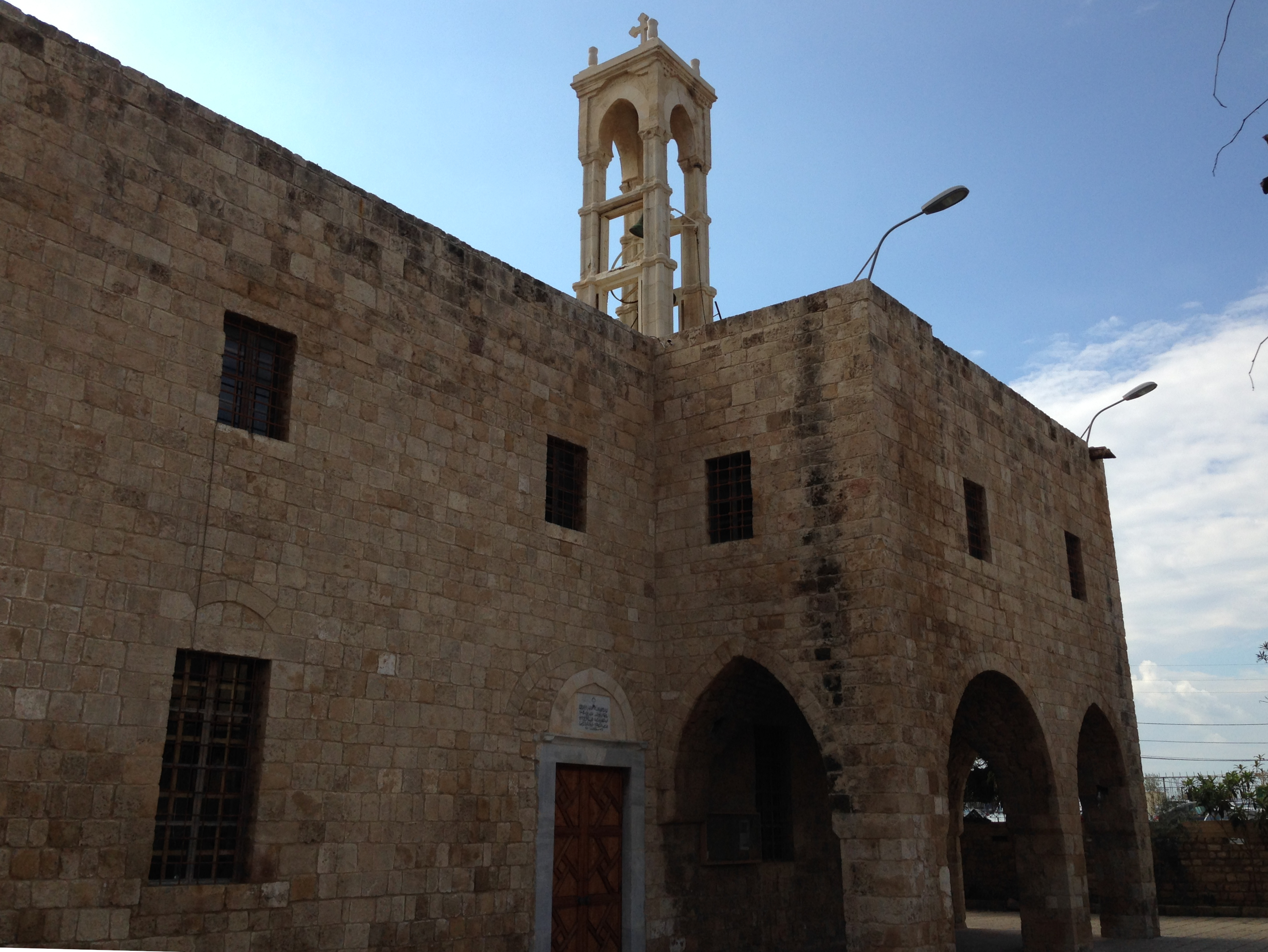

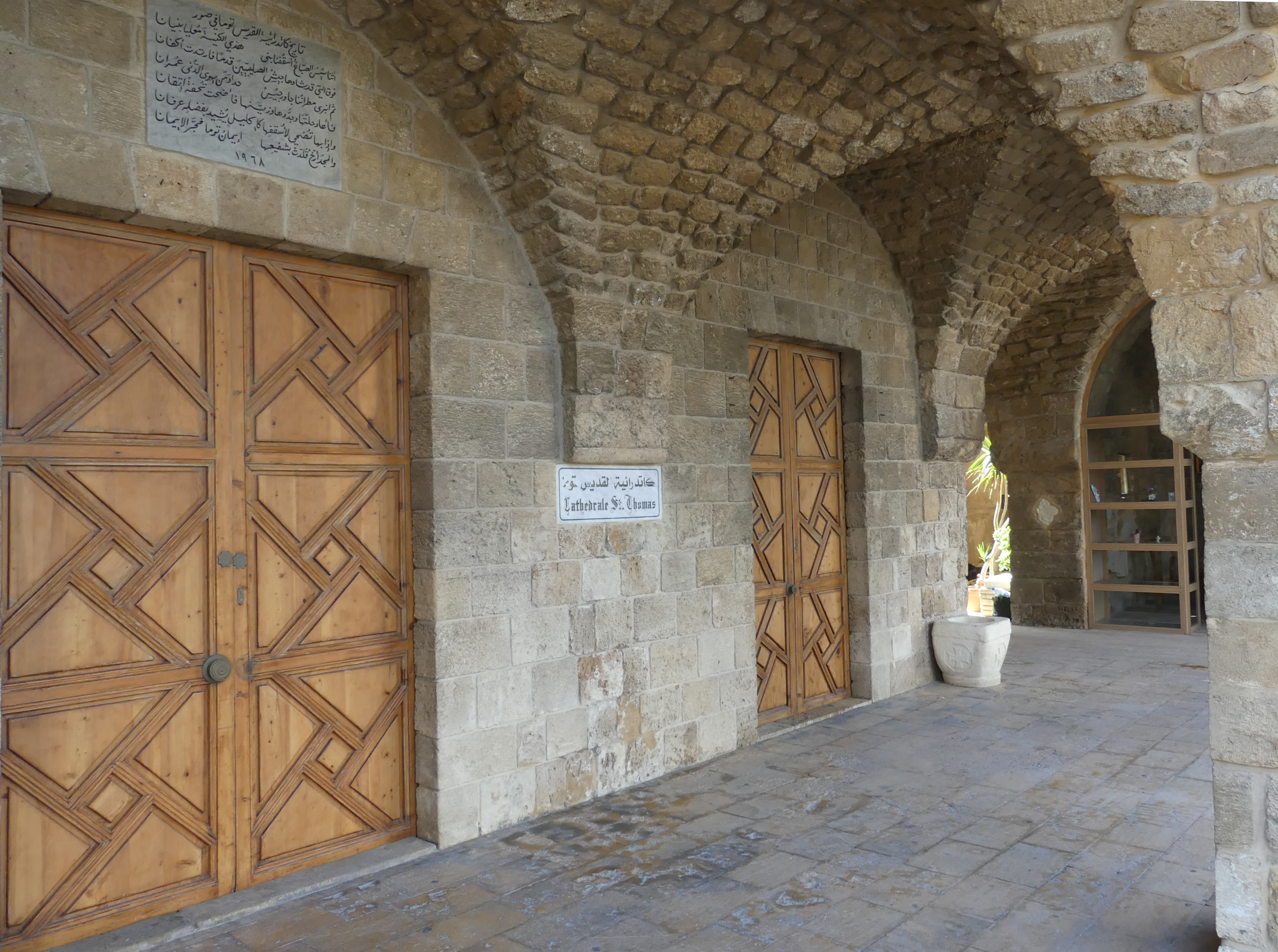

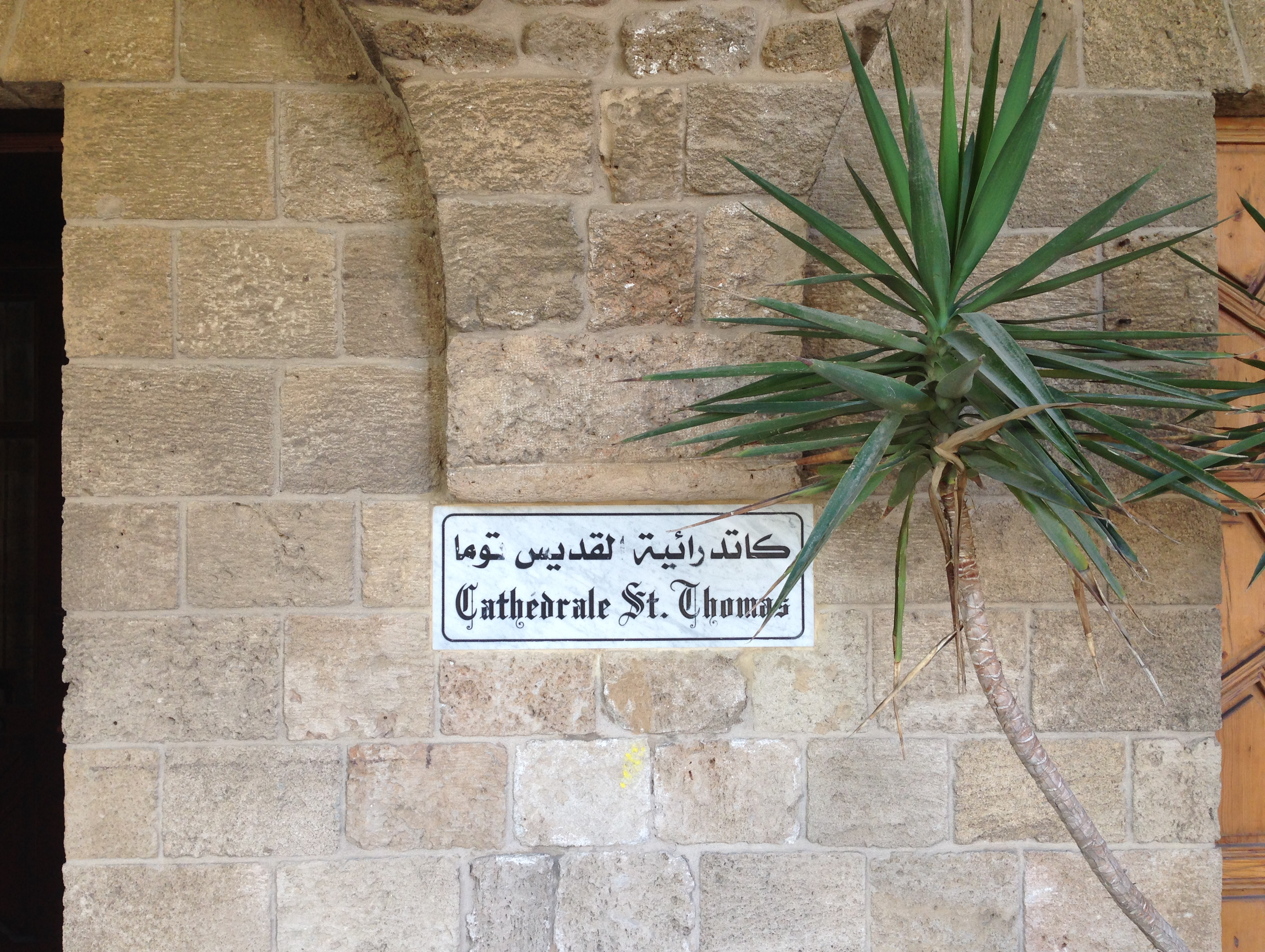

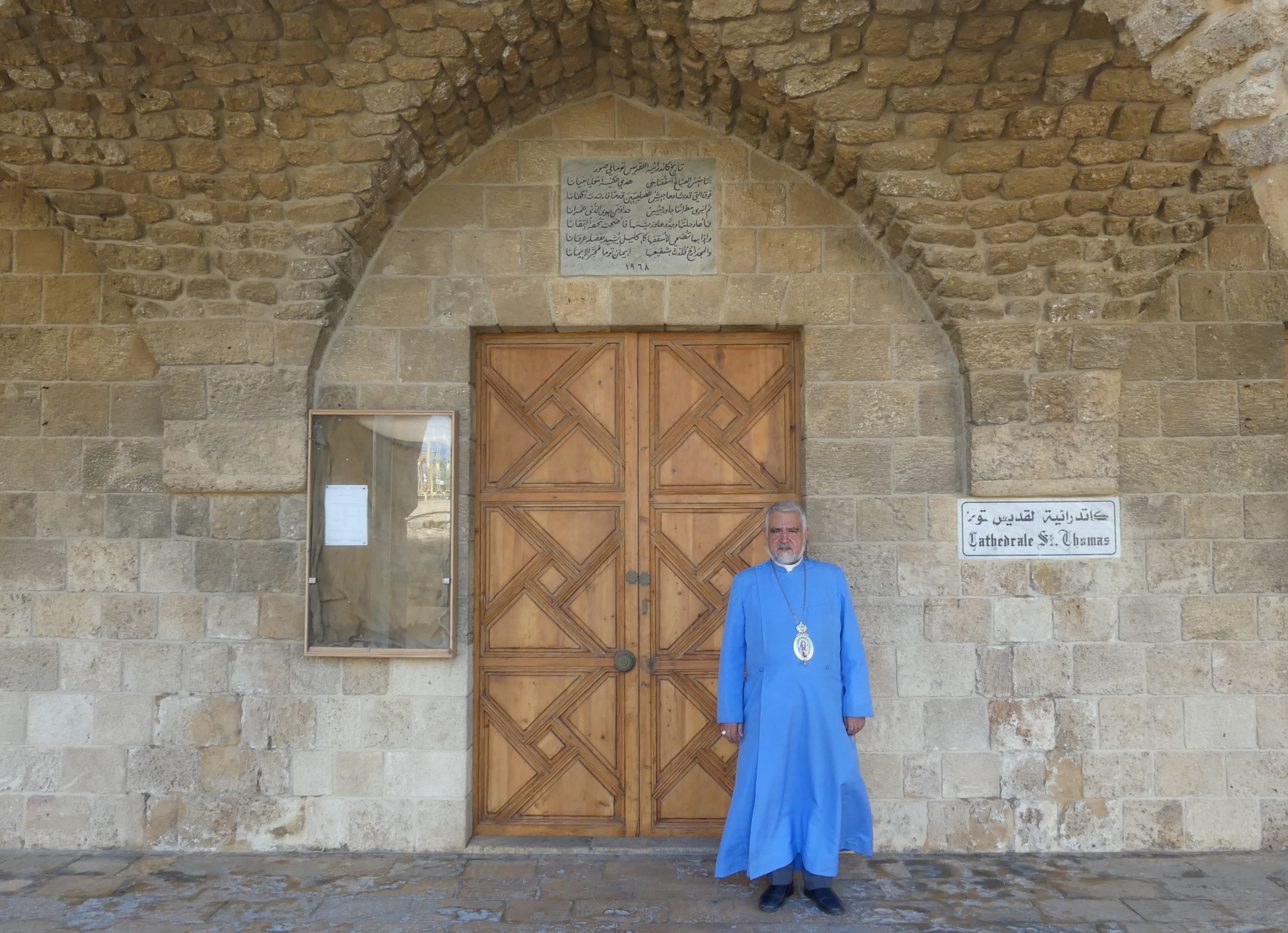

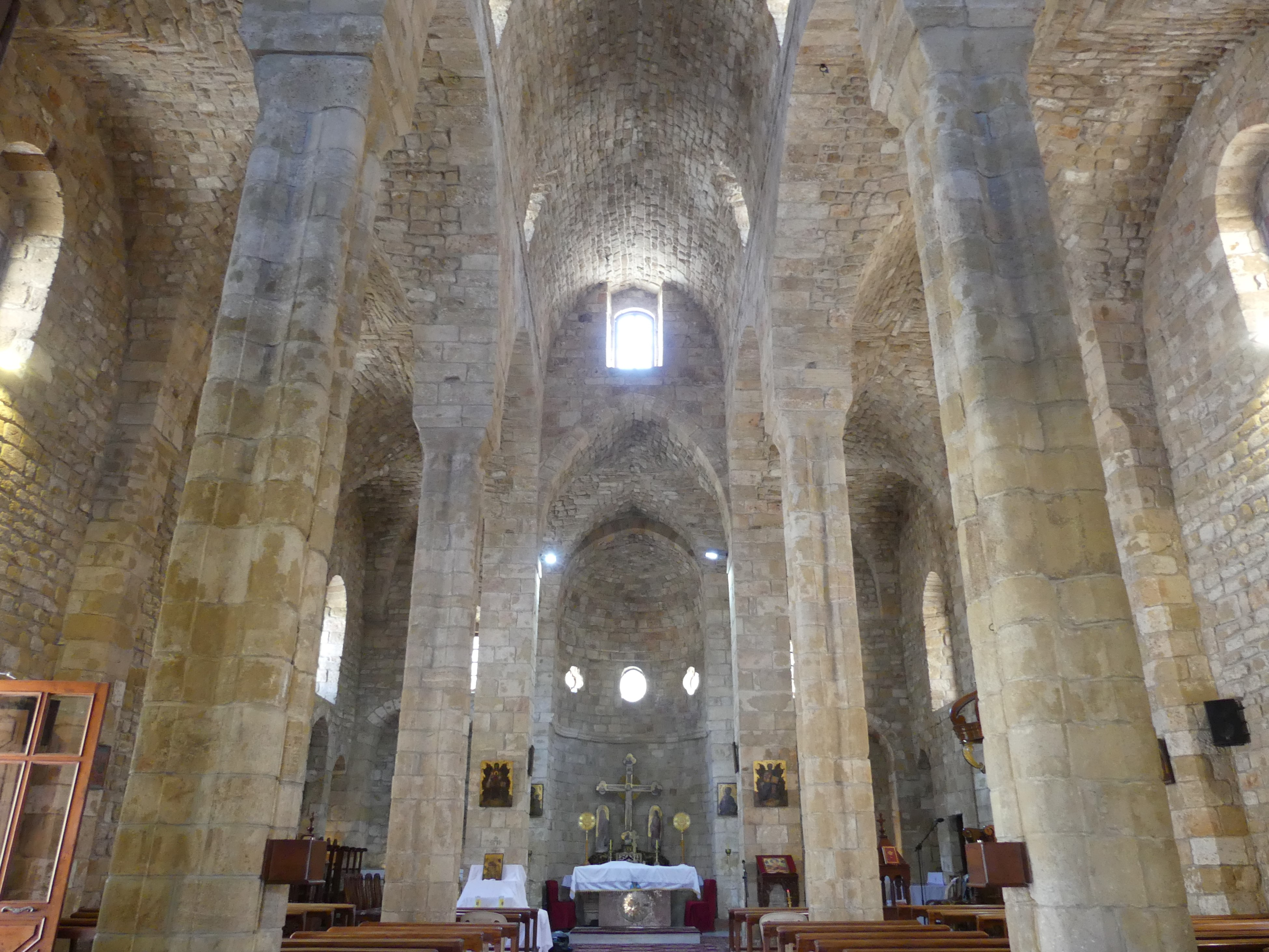

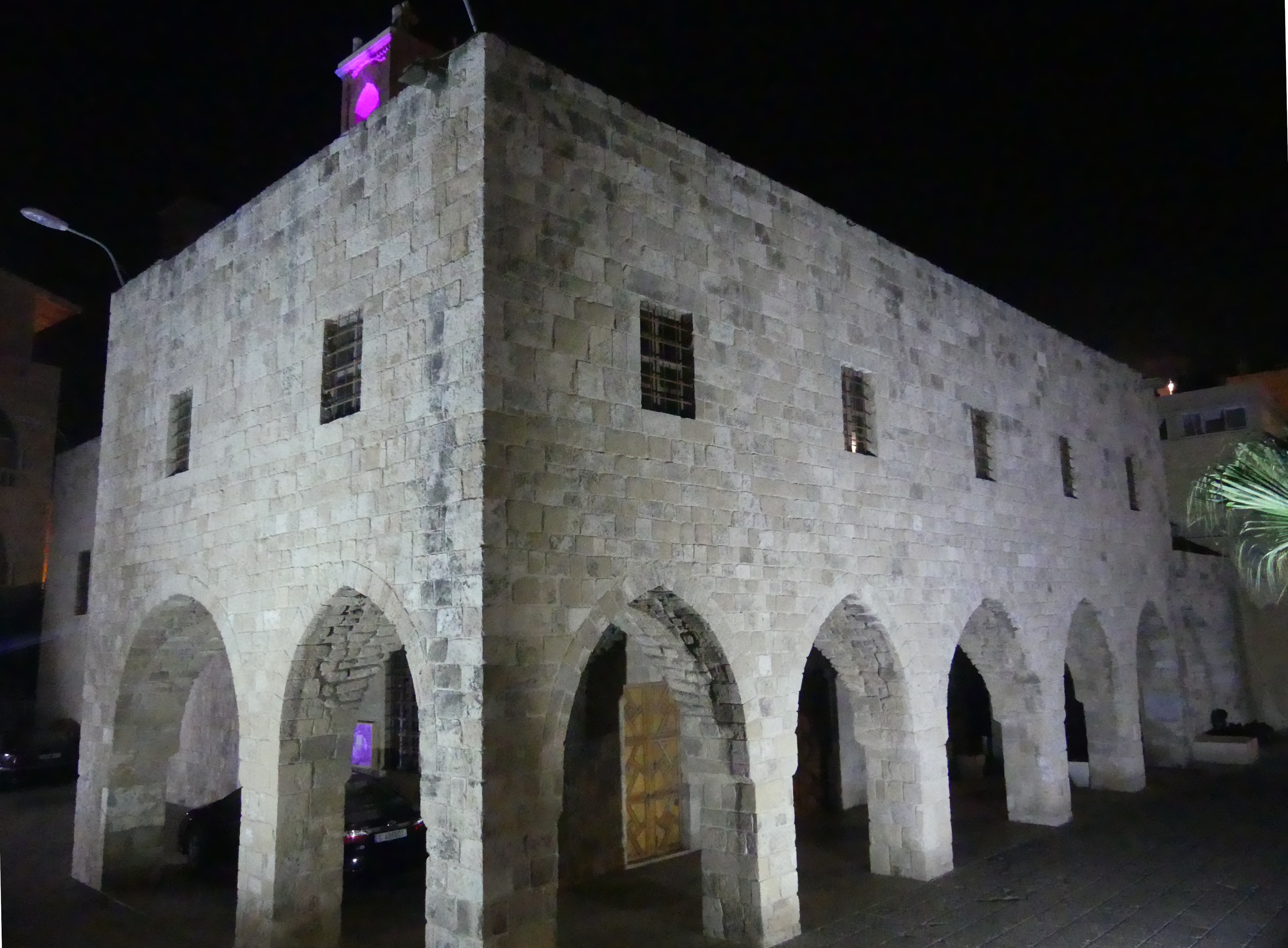

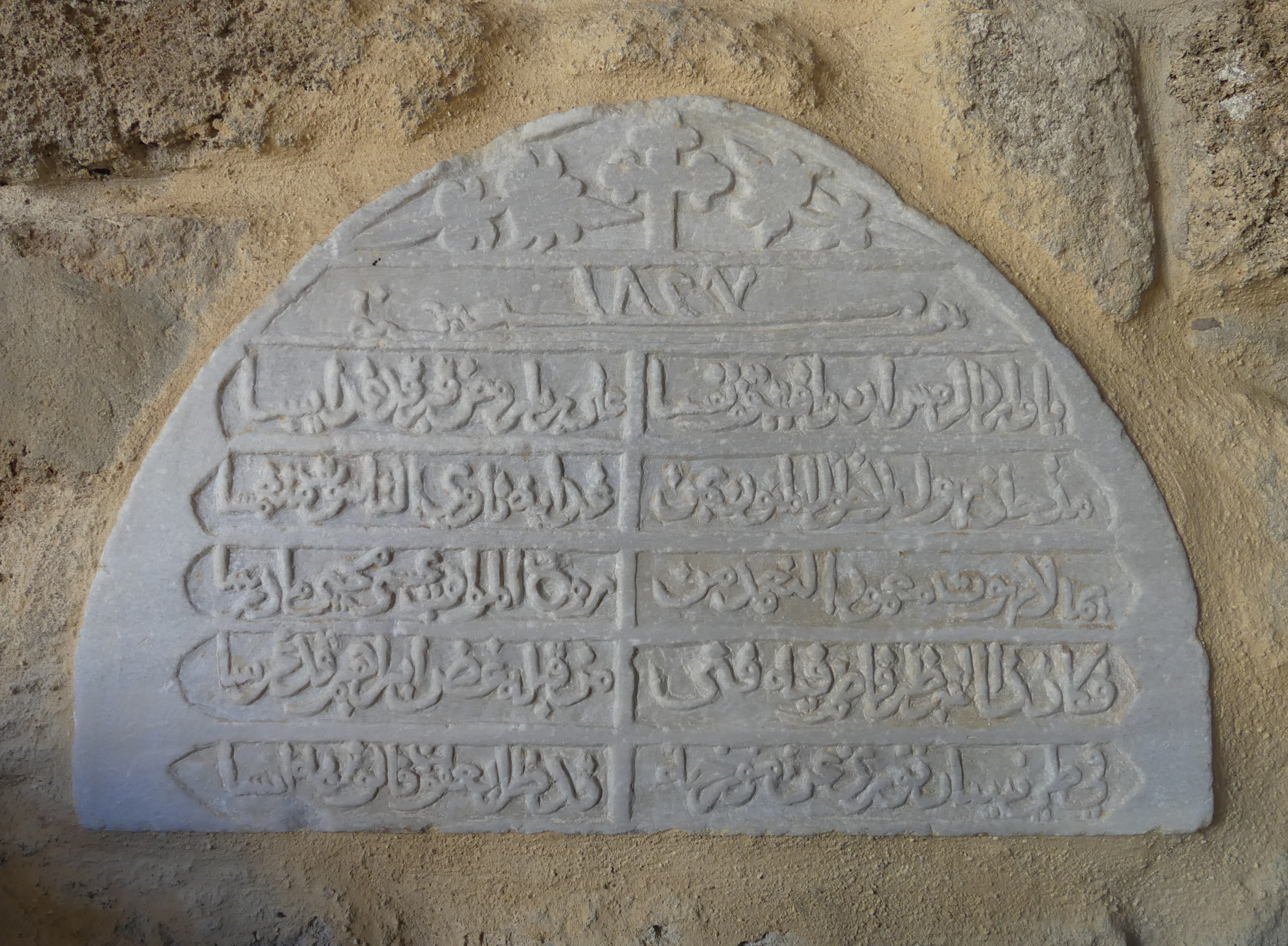

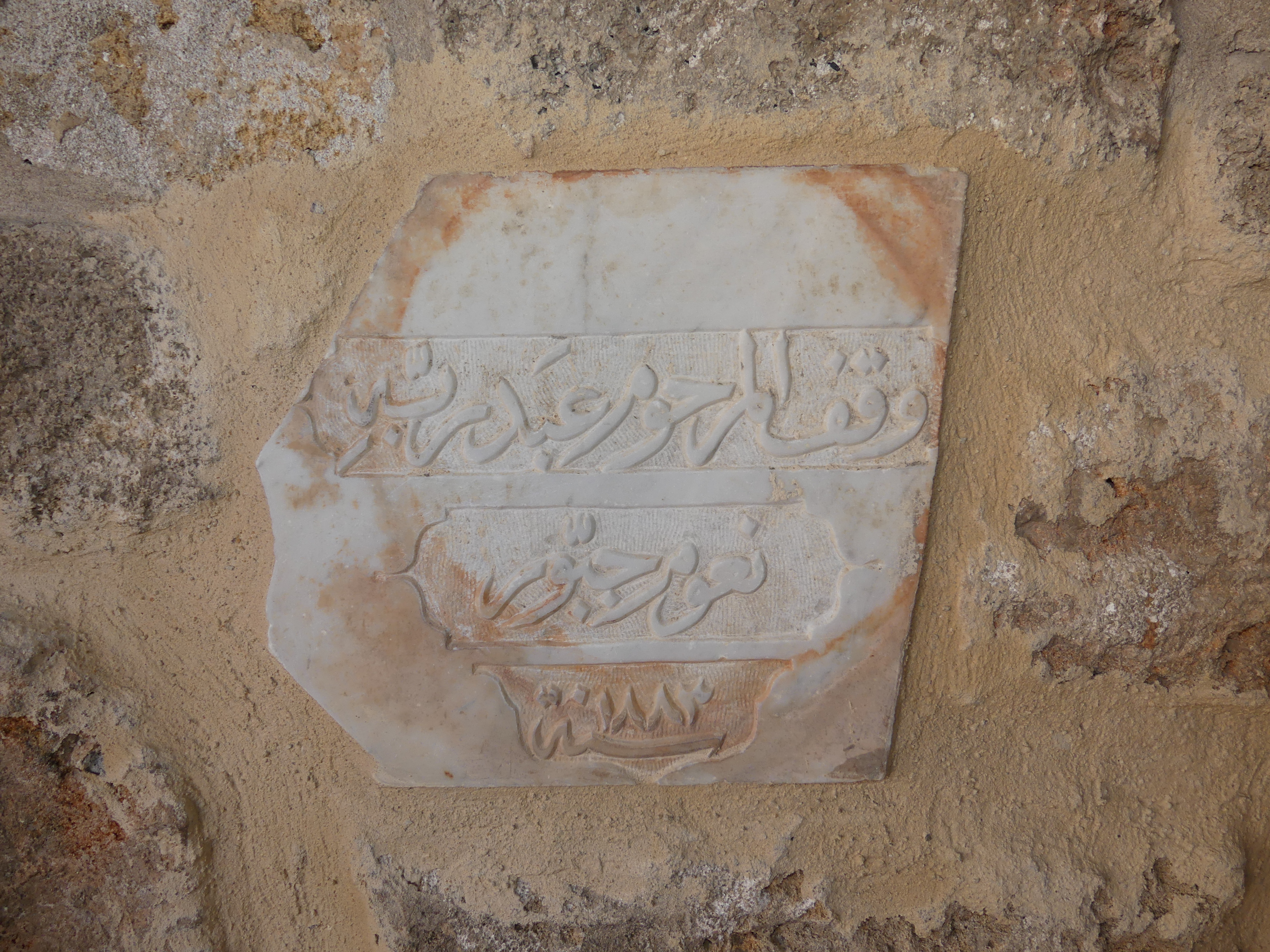

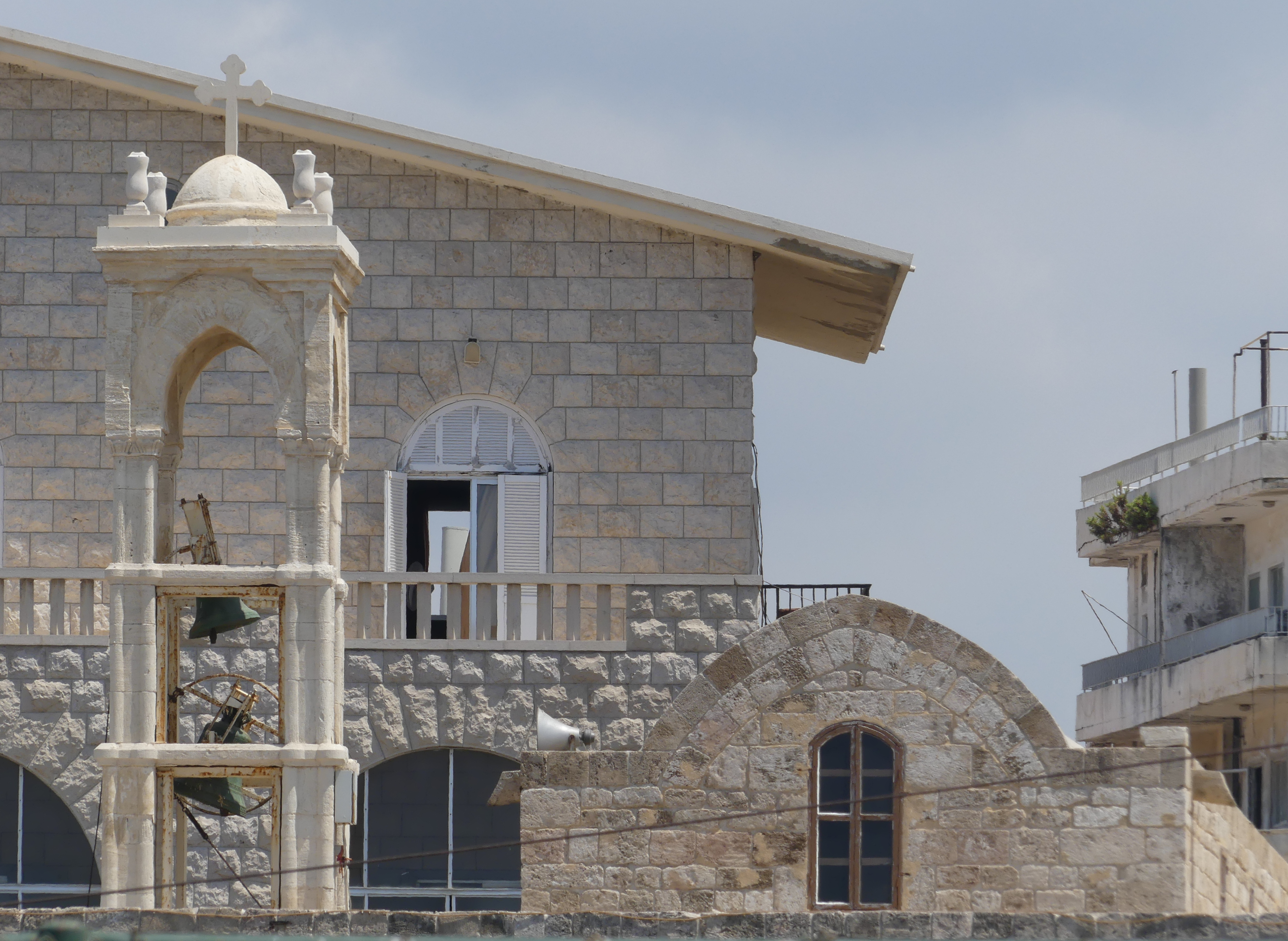

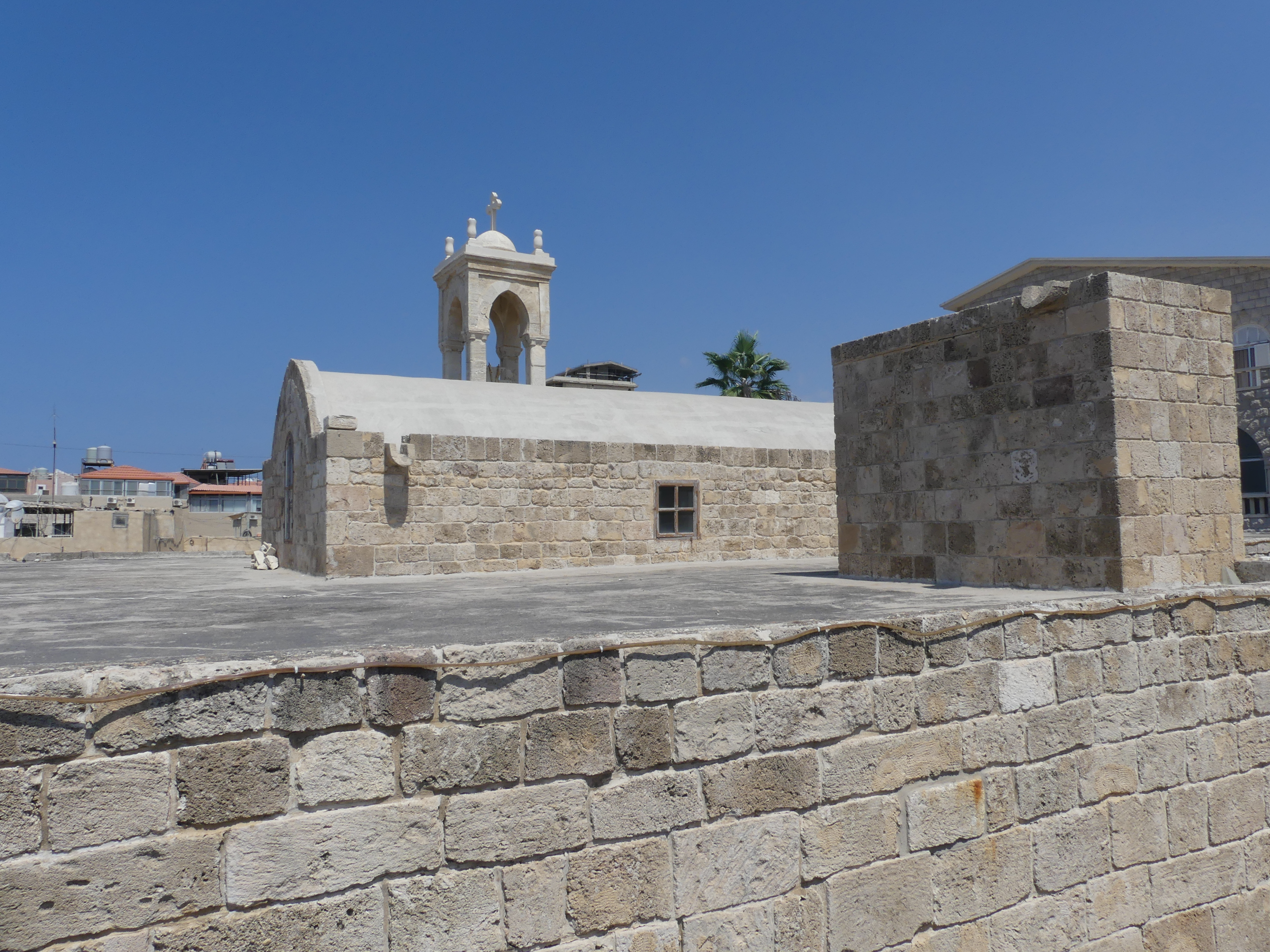

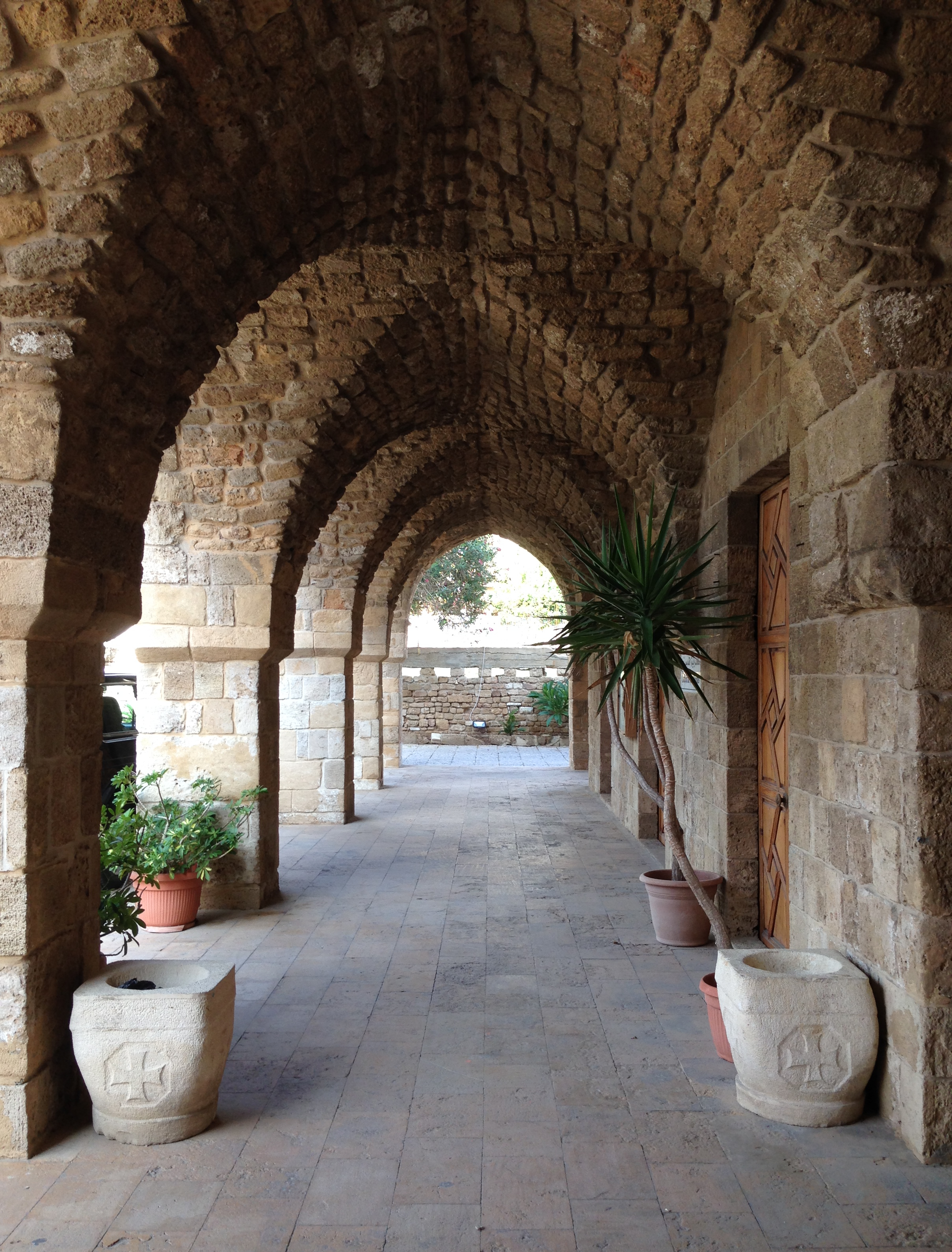

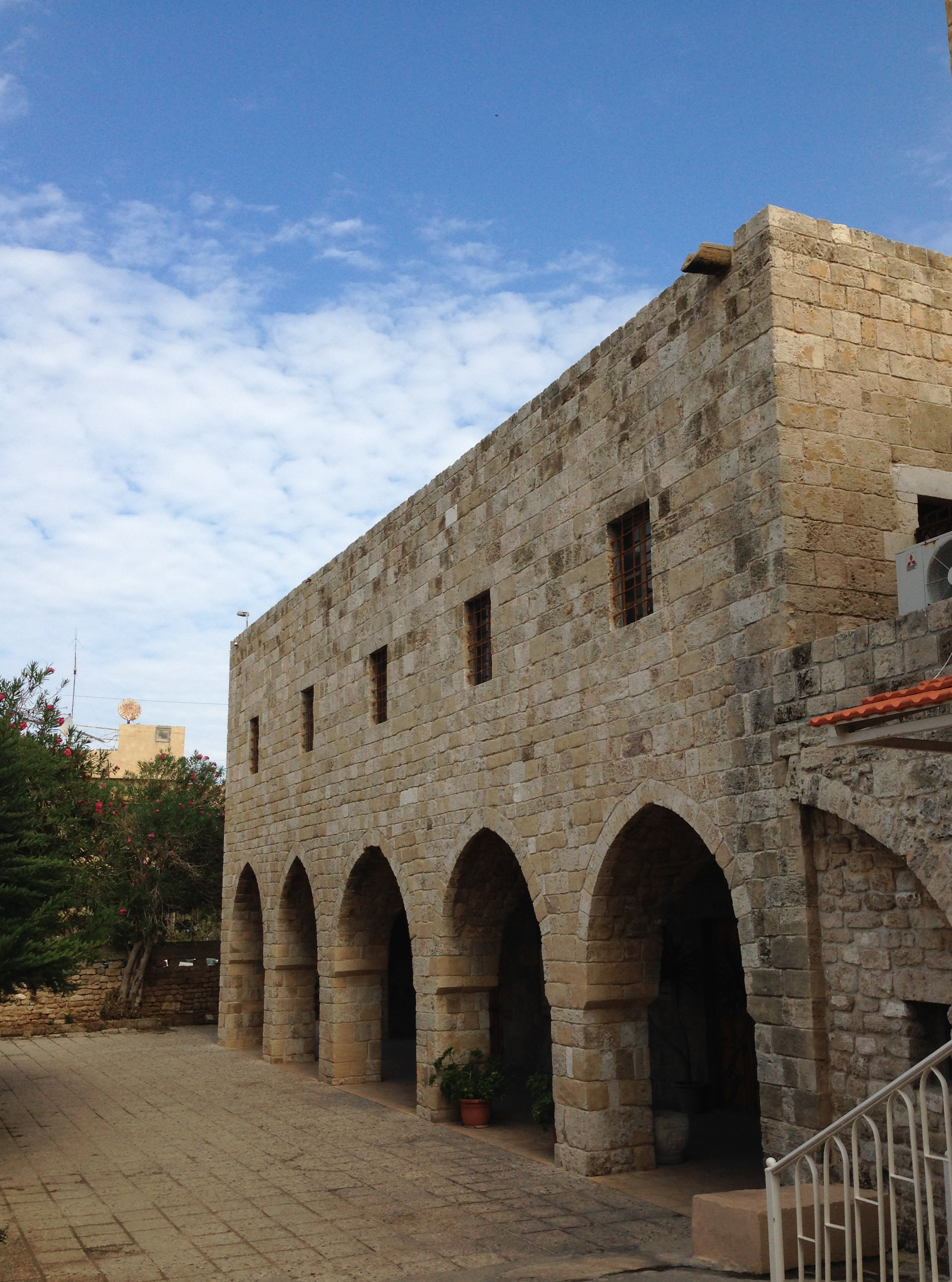

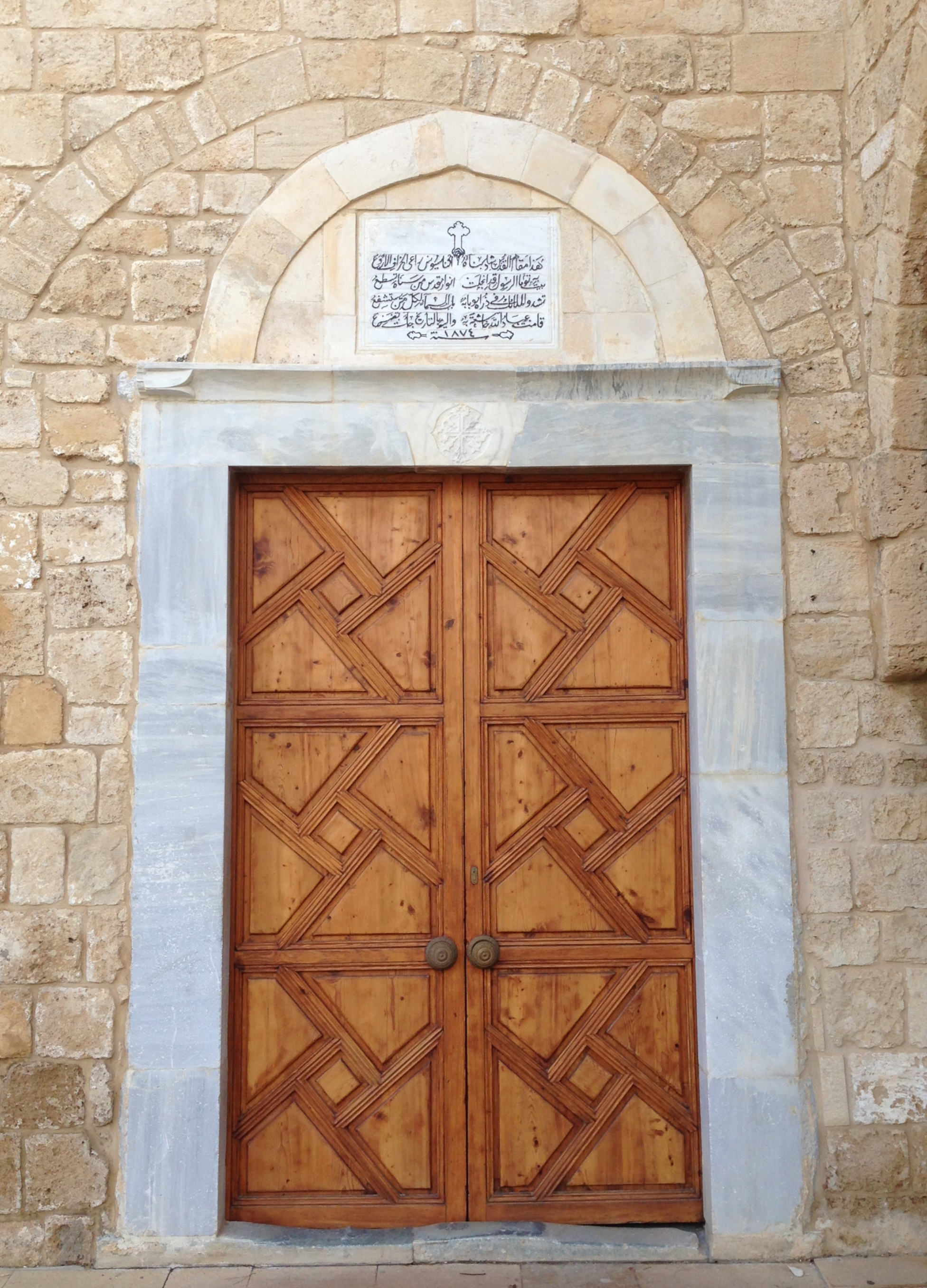

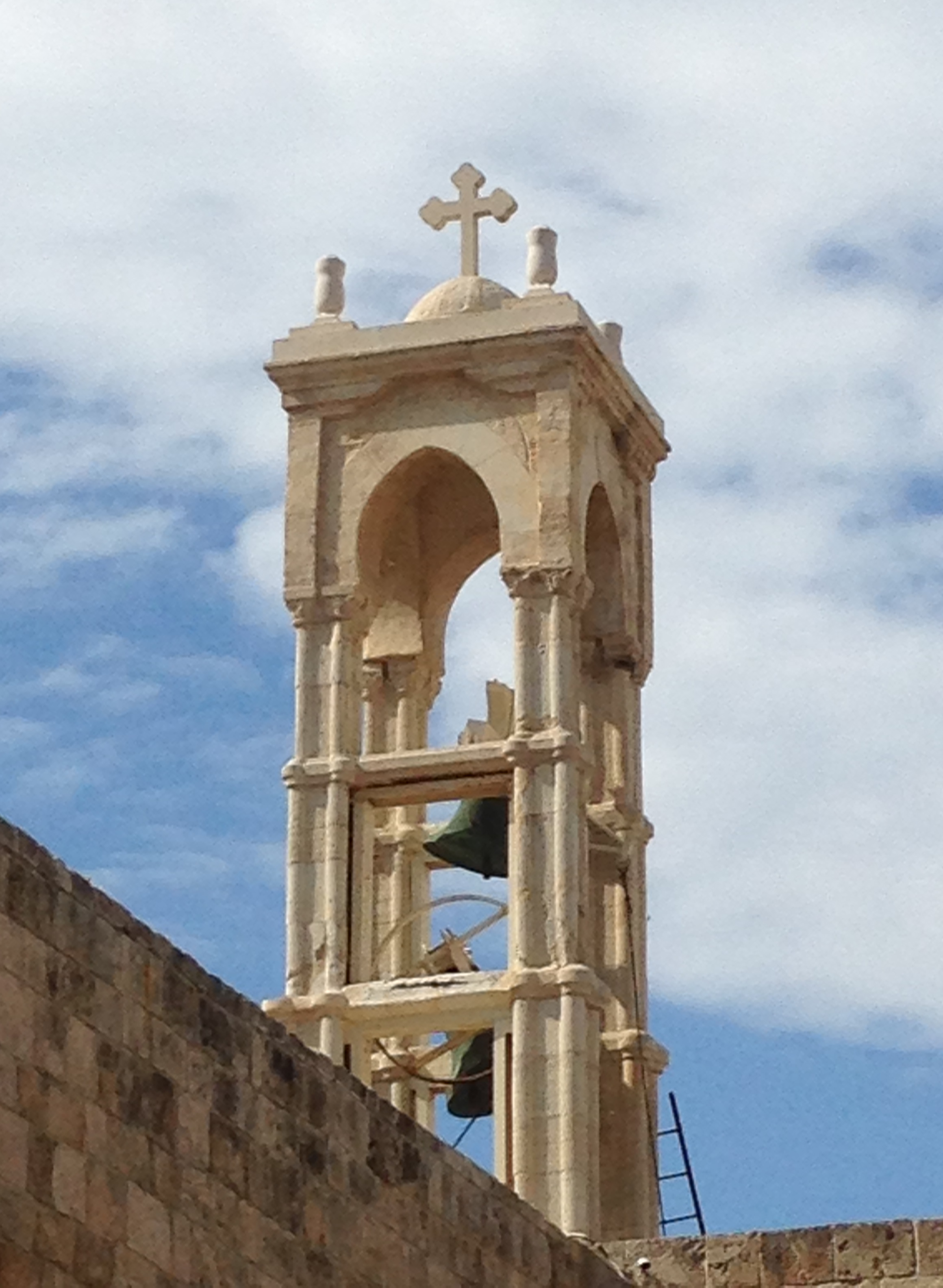

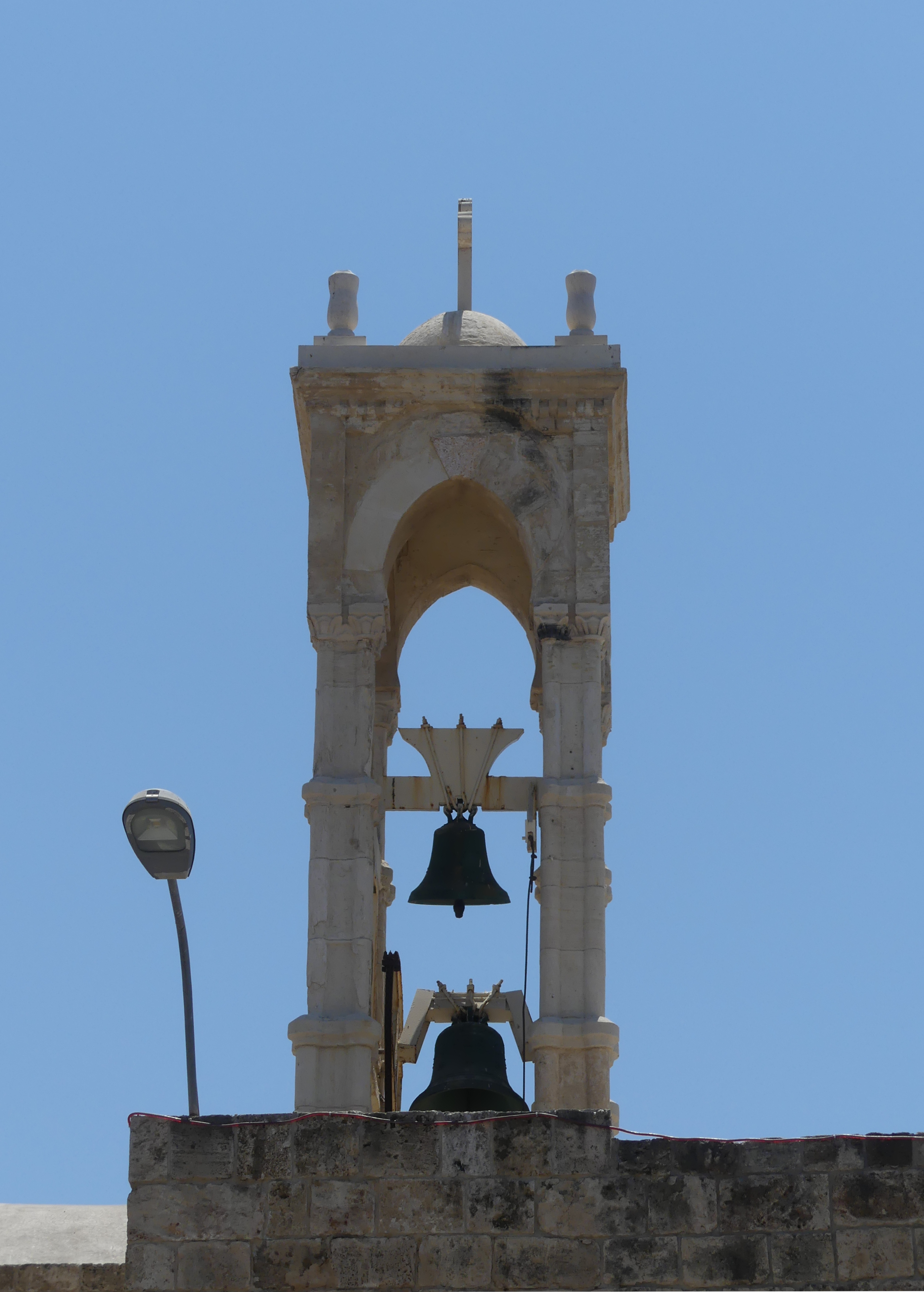

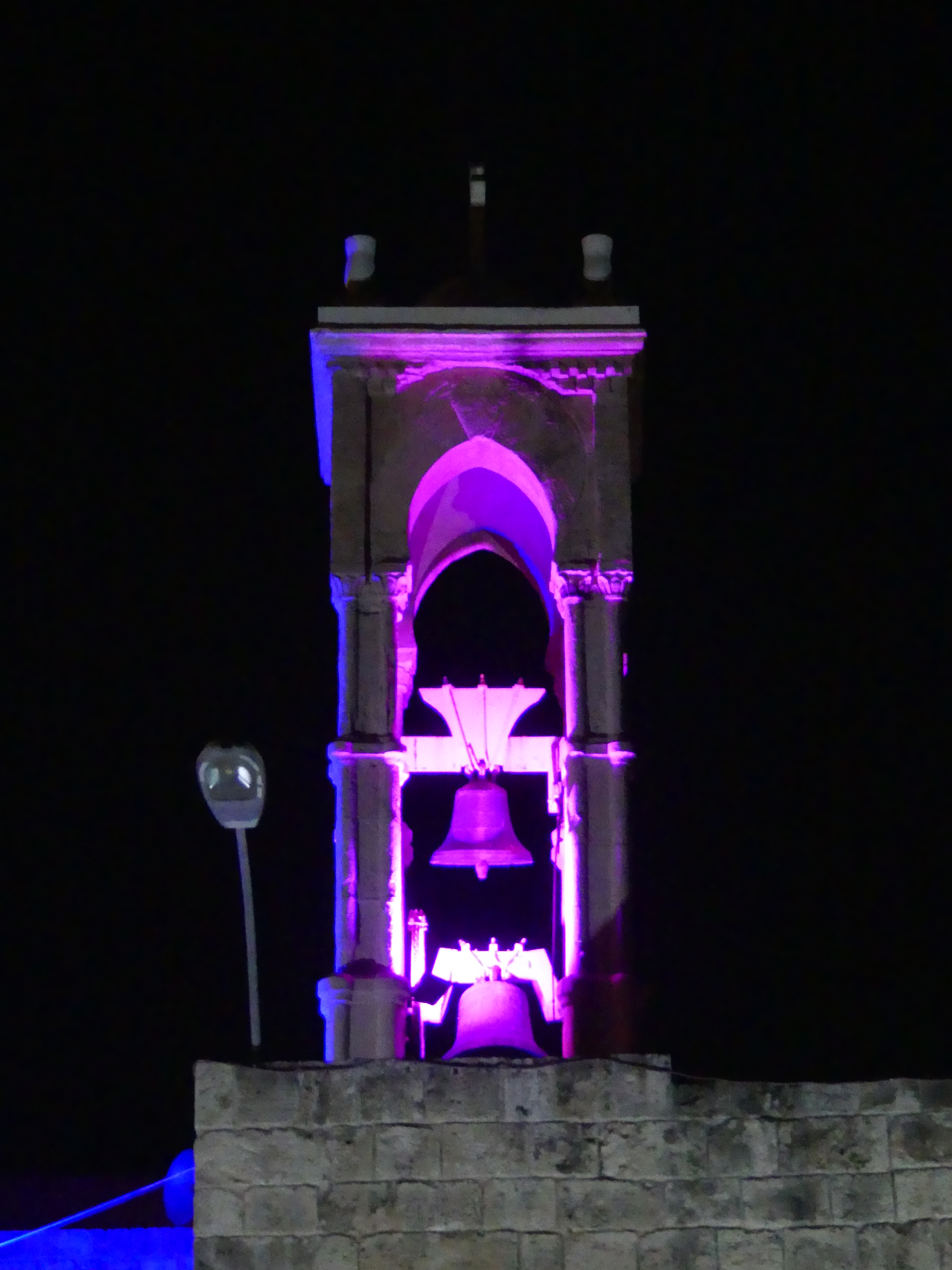

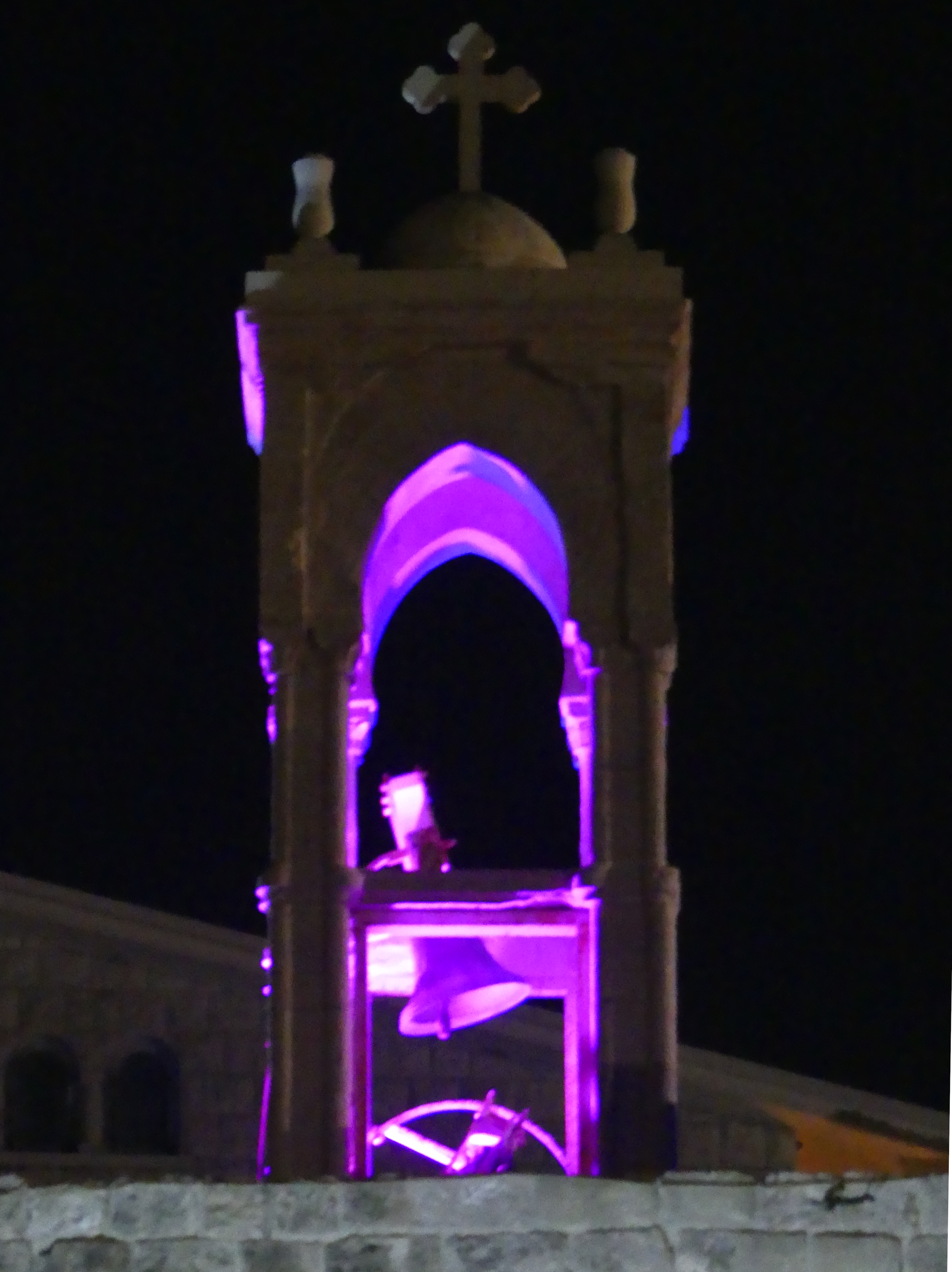

=== Saint Joseph in Qana ===
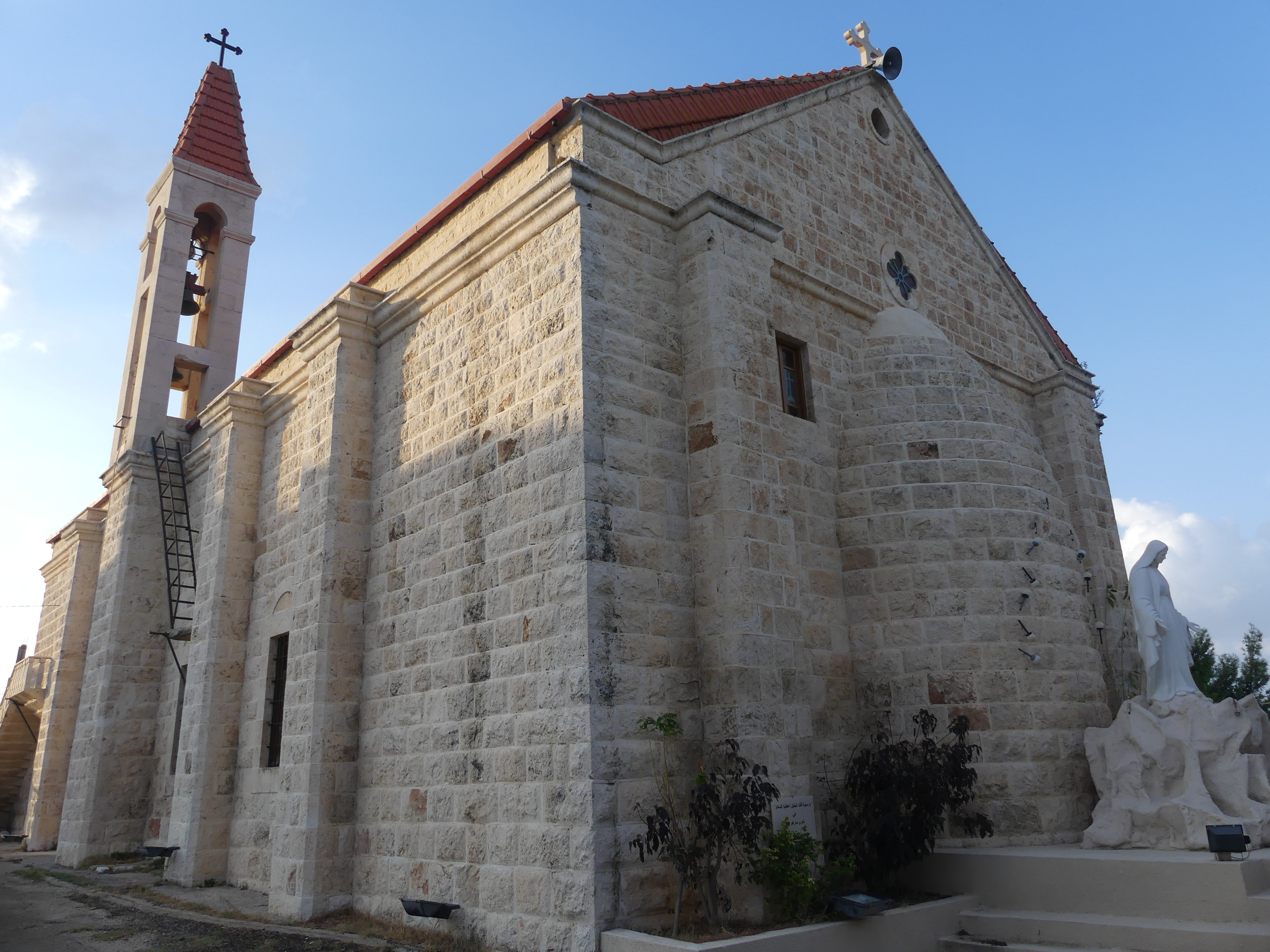

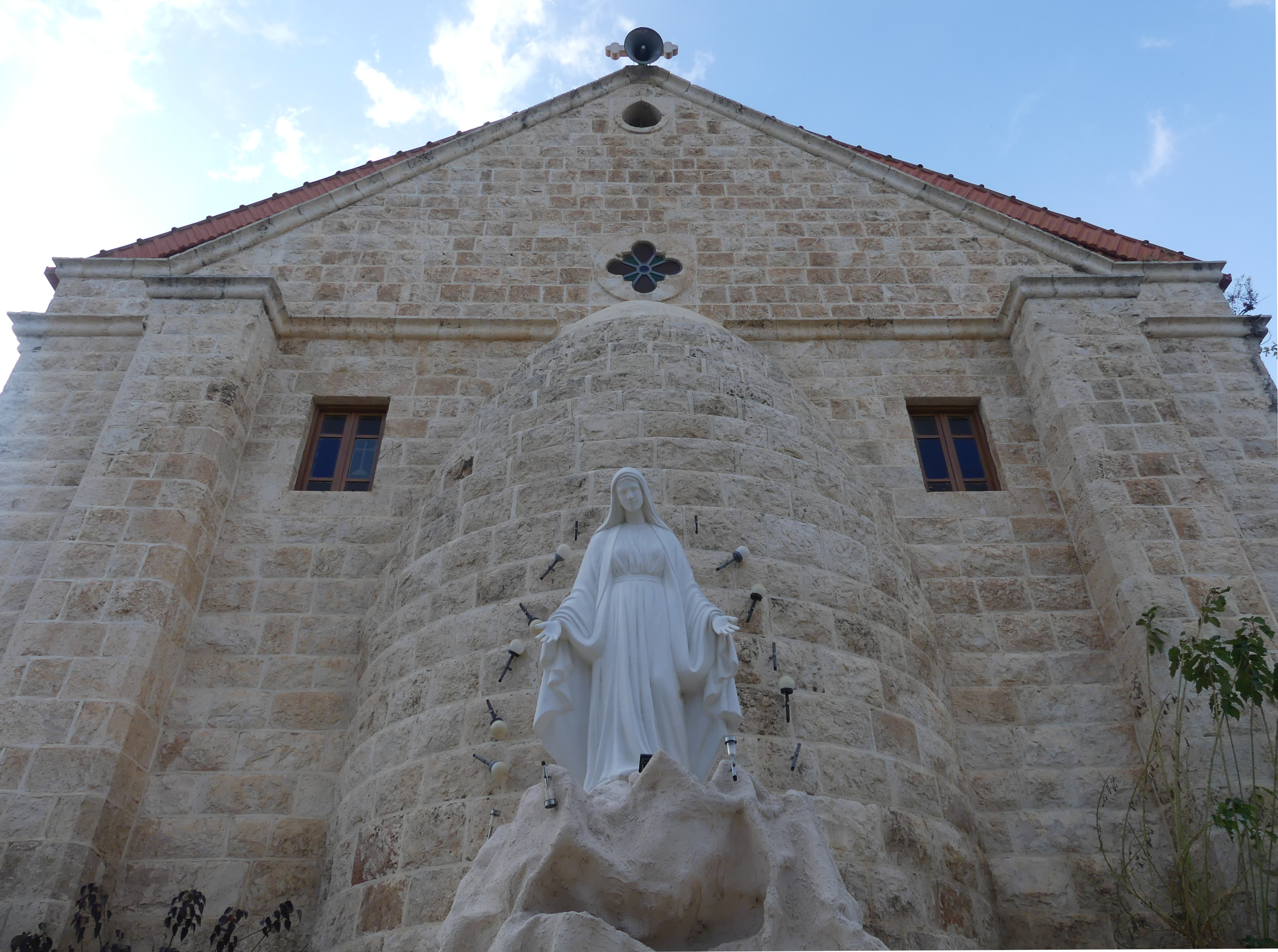

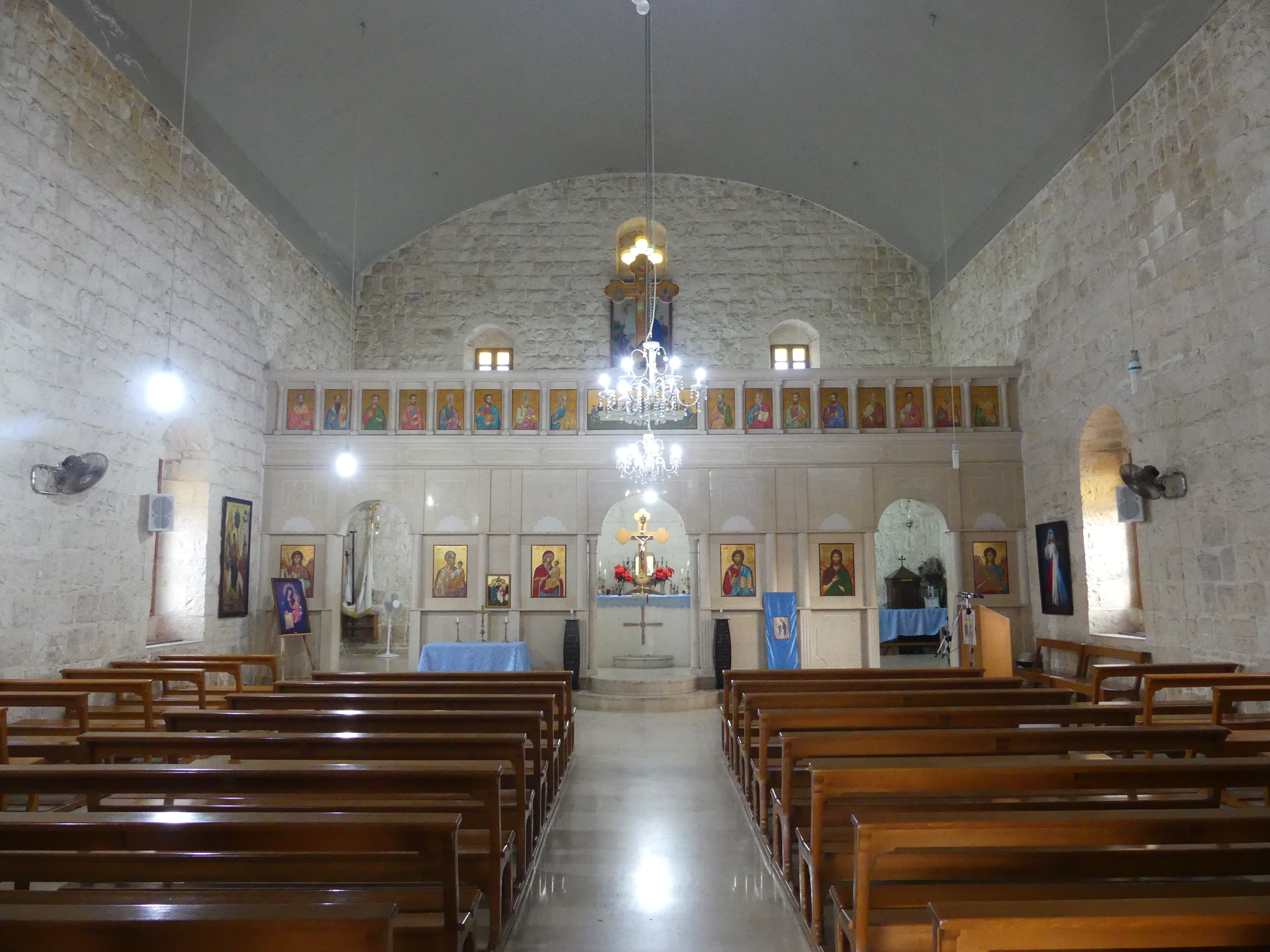

== See also ==
See of Tyre
