= Ain al-Mir =

Ain al-Mir عين المير
- Municipality
- Location in Lebanon
- Coordinates: 33°32′25.70744″N 35°27′16.78039″E
- Country: Lebanon
- Governorate: South Governorate
- District: Jezzine District
- Time zone: UTC+2 (EET)
  - Summer (DST): +3

Ain al-Mir (Arabic: عين المير, romanized: ʿAyn al-Mīr) is a municipality in the Jezzine District of the South Governorate of Lebanon.

== Demographics ==
In 2014, Christians made up 99.19% of registered voters in Ain al-Mir. 72.21% of the voters were Greek Catholics and 23.73% were Maronite Catholics.
