= Michel Abrass =

Syrian archbishop and catholic priest

Michel Abrass B.A.
- Former Melkite Greek Catholic Archbishop of Tyre
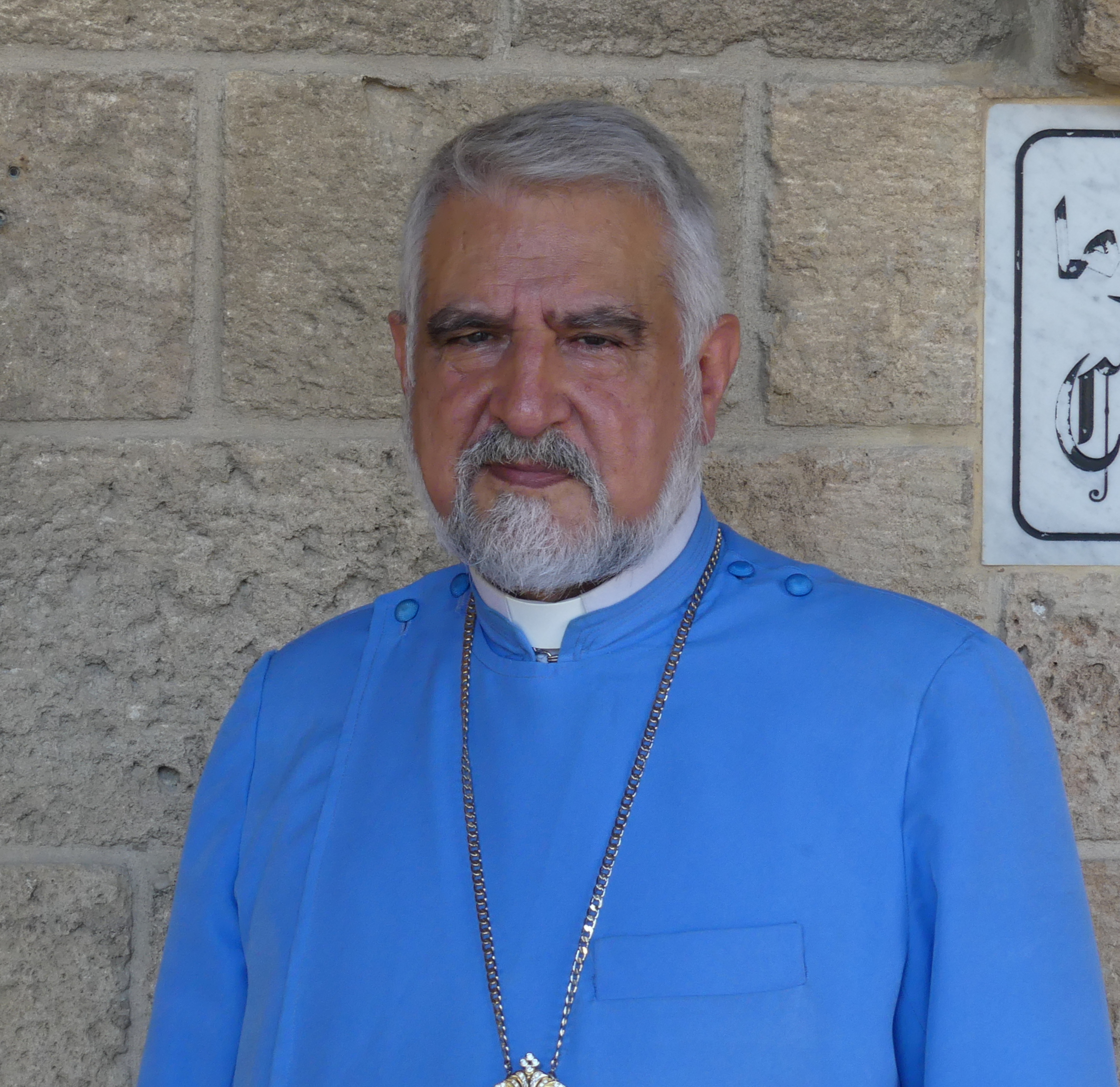
- Sayedna Michel Abrass, in 2019
- Church: Melkite Greek Catholic Church
- See: Tyre
- Installed: 21 June 2014
- Term ended: 31 January 2021
- Predecessor: George Bacouni
- Previous posts: Curial Bishop of Patriarchate of Antioch; Titular Archbishop of Myra dei Greco-Melkiti (2006–2014)

Orders
- Ordination: 11 April 1980
- Consecration: 10 December 2006 by Gregory III Laham

Personal details
- Born: December 14, 1948 (age 77) Aleppo, Syria
- Denomination: Melkite Greek Catholic Church
- Residence: Syria, Lebanon
- Education: Holy Spirit University of Kaslik

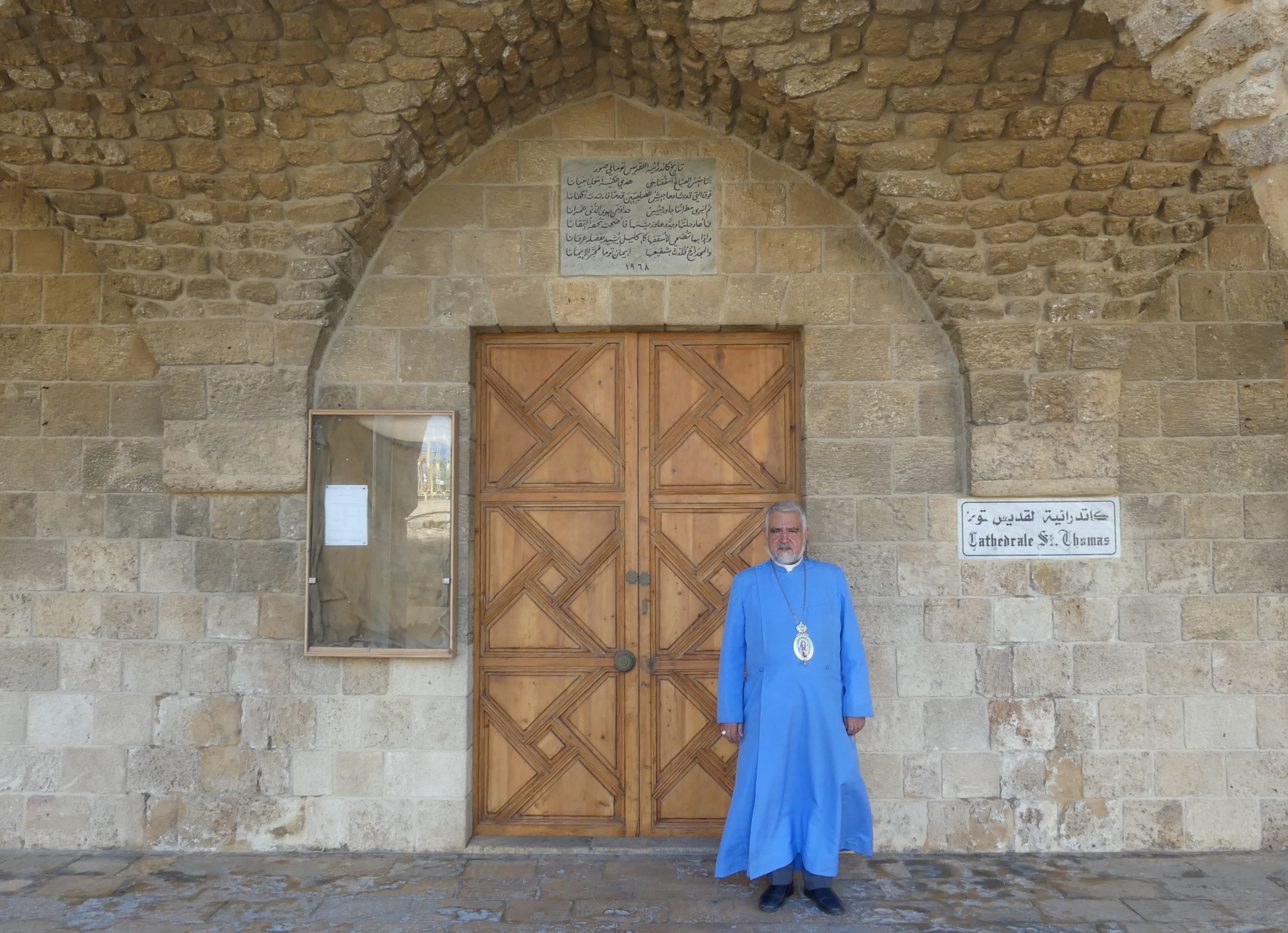
Sayedna Abrass at St. Thomas

Michel Abrass, BA (born 14 December 1948) is a Syrian-born Lebanese Melkite Catholic hierarch, who served as Archbishop of the Melkite Greek Catholic Archeparchy of Tyre from 2014 to 2021.

== Biography ==
Michel Abrass was born in Aleppo, Syria. In 1973 he earned a licentiate in philosophy at the Holy Spirit University of Kaslik and continued his studies in philosophy, theology, and liturgy at the Greek College in Rome. In 1980 Abrass concluded his studies in philosophy, theology and liturgy, and in 1980 obtained a licentiate in liturgy.

Abrass was ordained a priest on 11 April 1981 and is a member of the Aleppinian Basilians. He was rector of his order's minor and major seminaries. He was also professor of liturgy at the University of Kaslik.

On 17 October 2006, Pope Benedict XVI consented to the Melkite Synod choice of Abrass as Curial Bishop of Antioch and titular bishop of Abydus. On 11 November 2006 he was appointed Titular Archbishop of Myra of Greek Melkites and on 10 December 2006 was consecrated bishop by the Melkite Patriarch of Antioch, Gregory III Laham. His co-consecrators were Archeparch Isidore Battikha, BA, from Homs and Archeparch Joseph Kallas of Beirut and Byblos, SMSP. The Synod of the Melkite bishops elected him Secretary General in 2007.

On 21 June 2014, Patriarch Gregory III Laham in accordance with the Melkite Synod named him Archbishop of Tyre.

On 31 January 2021, without explanation, Pope Francis declared the see of Tyre vacant and named Elie Bechara Haddad, Archbishop of the Melkite Greek Catholic Archeparchy of Sidon, to serve as apostolic administrator.

== Views ==
In October 2010 Abrass was a delegate to the Special Assembly of the Synod of Bishops in Rome. Discussing the question of vocations, he said that in the Middle East:

...in regard to the formation of seminarians, in the first place is the problem of their selection. It cannot be denied that at present the greater part chooses the ecclesiastical "career" and not the vocation, and this to achieve a socially eminent position or for economic considerations.

He also spoke of Christians in Iraq:

If we are ever able to solve the problems of all our churches? I doubt it! Let's take for example the problems of the Christian churches in Iraq - are but political in nature and therefore can only be solved politically ... Many lay people wonder how you will treat them when they profess to be Christians - that's why they take on a hasty secularism, depending on how emancipated their (often Muslim) interlocutor is. We should concede to this laity a certain liberalism ...
