= Dimitri Tavadze =

Georgian artist and scenographer

Dimitri Tavadze დიმიტრი თავაძე (in Georgian)
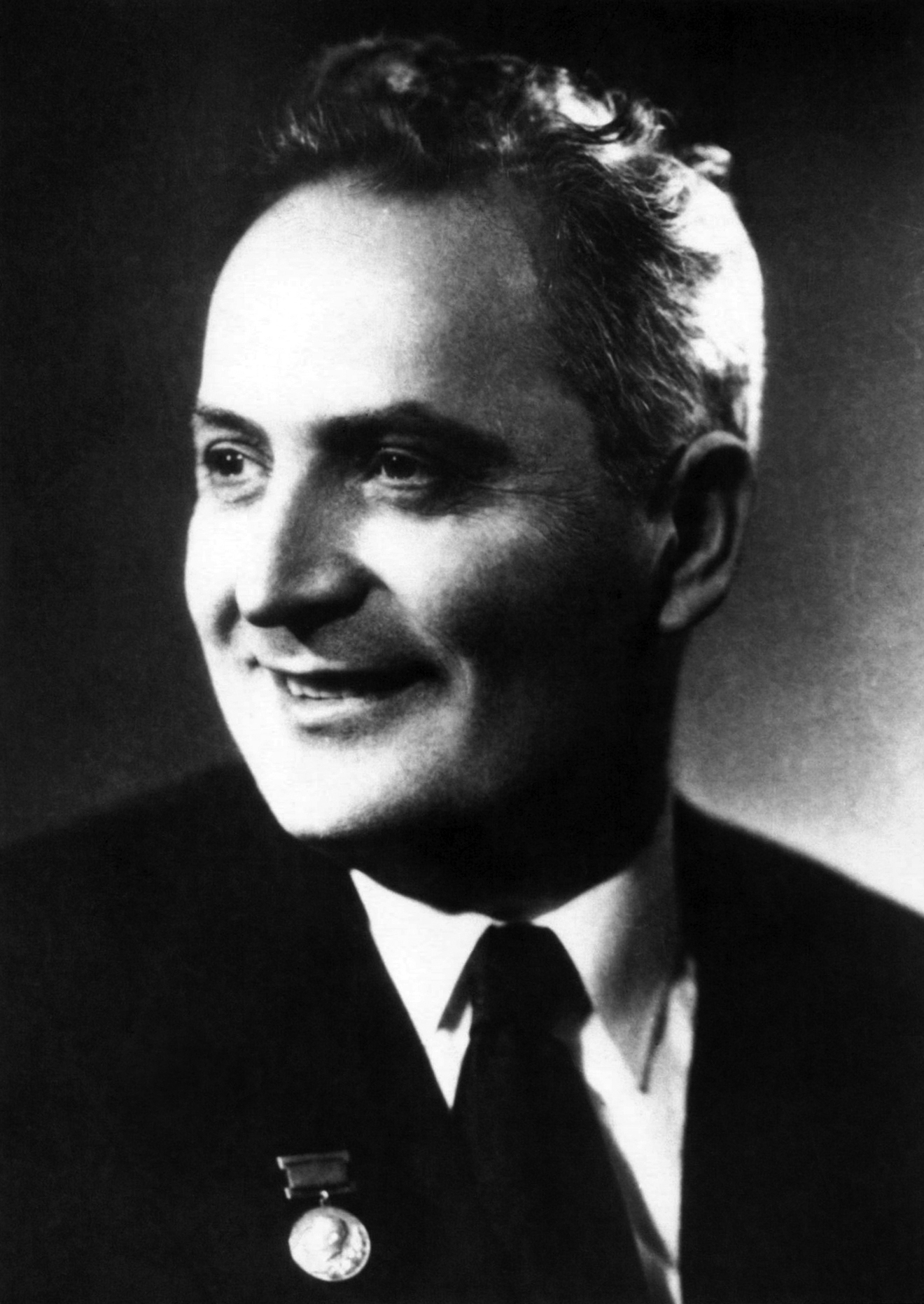
- Born: February 6, 1911; Village Tkhilagani, Kutais Governorate, Russian Empire
- Died: March 6, 1990 (79 years old); Tbilisi, Georgian Soviet Socialist Republic
- Known for: Scenic design

Dimitri Tavadze (Georgian: დიმიტრი თავაძე; February 6, 1911 – March 6, 1990) was a Georgian artist and scenographer.

== Biography ==
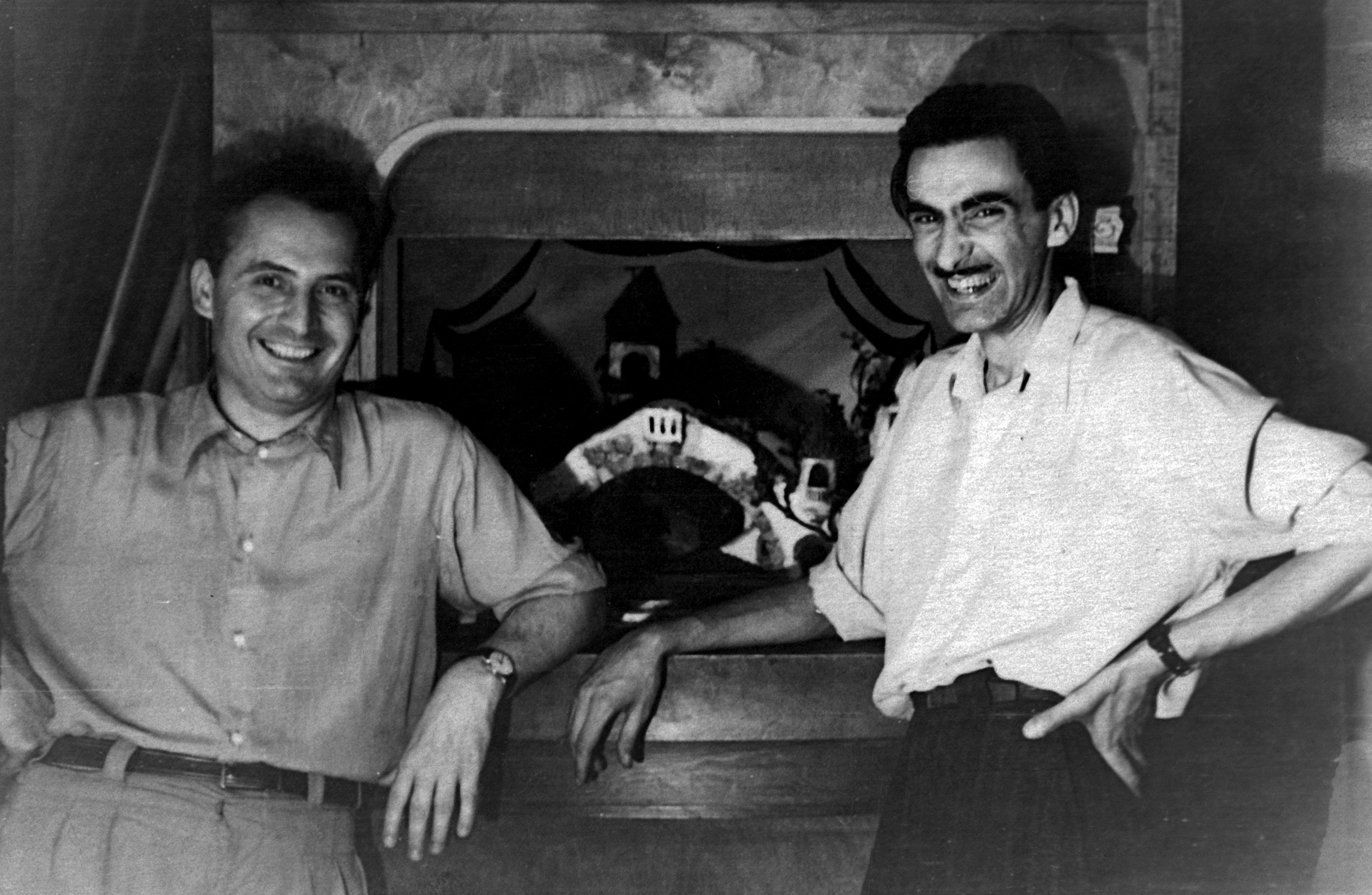
Dimitri Tavadze and Mikheil Tumanishvili

Tavadze was born on February 6, 1911, in the village of Tkhilagani, Kutais Governorate; at that time, Tkhilagani was part of the Russian empire. In 1926, he graduated from the secondary school of Kutaisi. During his apprenticeship, he took up drawing lessons together with Petre Otskheli at the art studio under the guidance of Vano Tcheishvili. In 1926, Tavadze entered Tbilisi State Academy of Arts majoring in painting. His teachers included Ioseb Sharleman, Gigo Gabashvili, Evgeni Lansere.

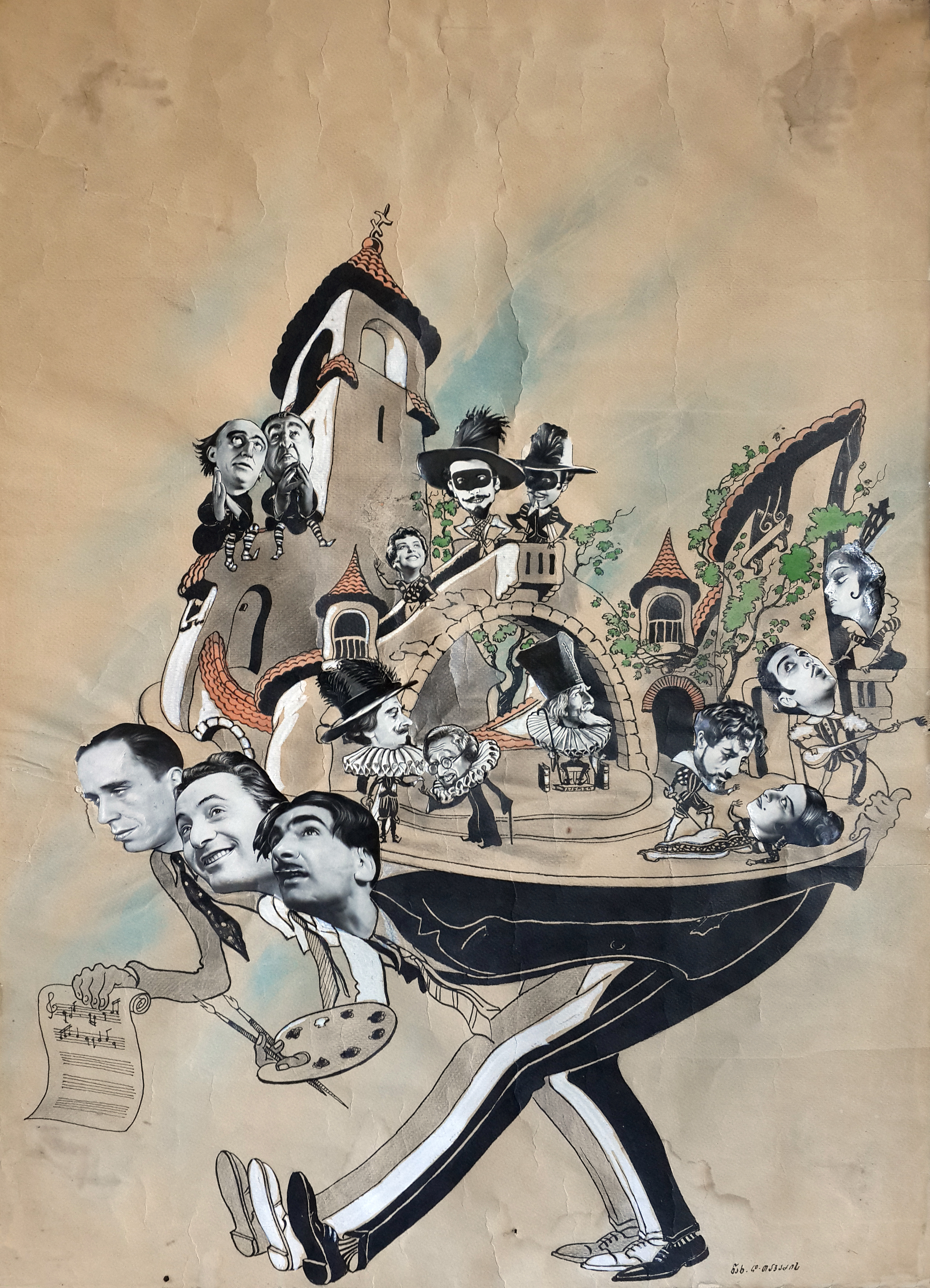
1954; Play – The Spanish Curate (Caricature; Stored at Rustaveli Theater Museum)

Starting in 1927, Tavadze began working at the Shota Rustaveli State Academic Theatre, first as an assistant producer (1927–1930), then as an artist (1930–1948). Subsequently, he was appointed to the position of the chief artist (1948–1976). In 1932, Tavadze made his artistic debut at the Rustaveli Theatre in O. Samsonidze's play, "The Hoop", directed by Sandro Akhmeteli and Shota Aghsabadze. In 1933, he made his first artistic appearance outside Georgia in Shakespeare's "Othello" in the Kirovabad Theatre, Azerbaijan.

In 1933, the painter Lado Gudiashvili dedicated a complimentary letter to Tavadze: "Dimitri Tavadze, a young artists was distinguished for consciousness and discretion; he, from the beginning owned the mystery of painting only feasible for rather experienced painters".

Tavadze illustrated over 150 plays in 20 different theaters. He collaborated renowned directors such as Sandro Akhmeteli, Dimitri Aleksidze, Mikheil Tumanishvili, Robert Sturua, and Irina Molostova. The majority of Tavadze's projects were staged at the Rustaveli Theatre (57 plays). Fletcher's comedy "The Spanish Curate" and Pavel Kohout's play "Such Love" won special recognition and success. Tavadze's last project was "Do not Abandon the Fire, Prometheus" (Kirovabad – 1983). Dimitri Tavadze died on March 6, 1990, in Tbilisi.

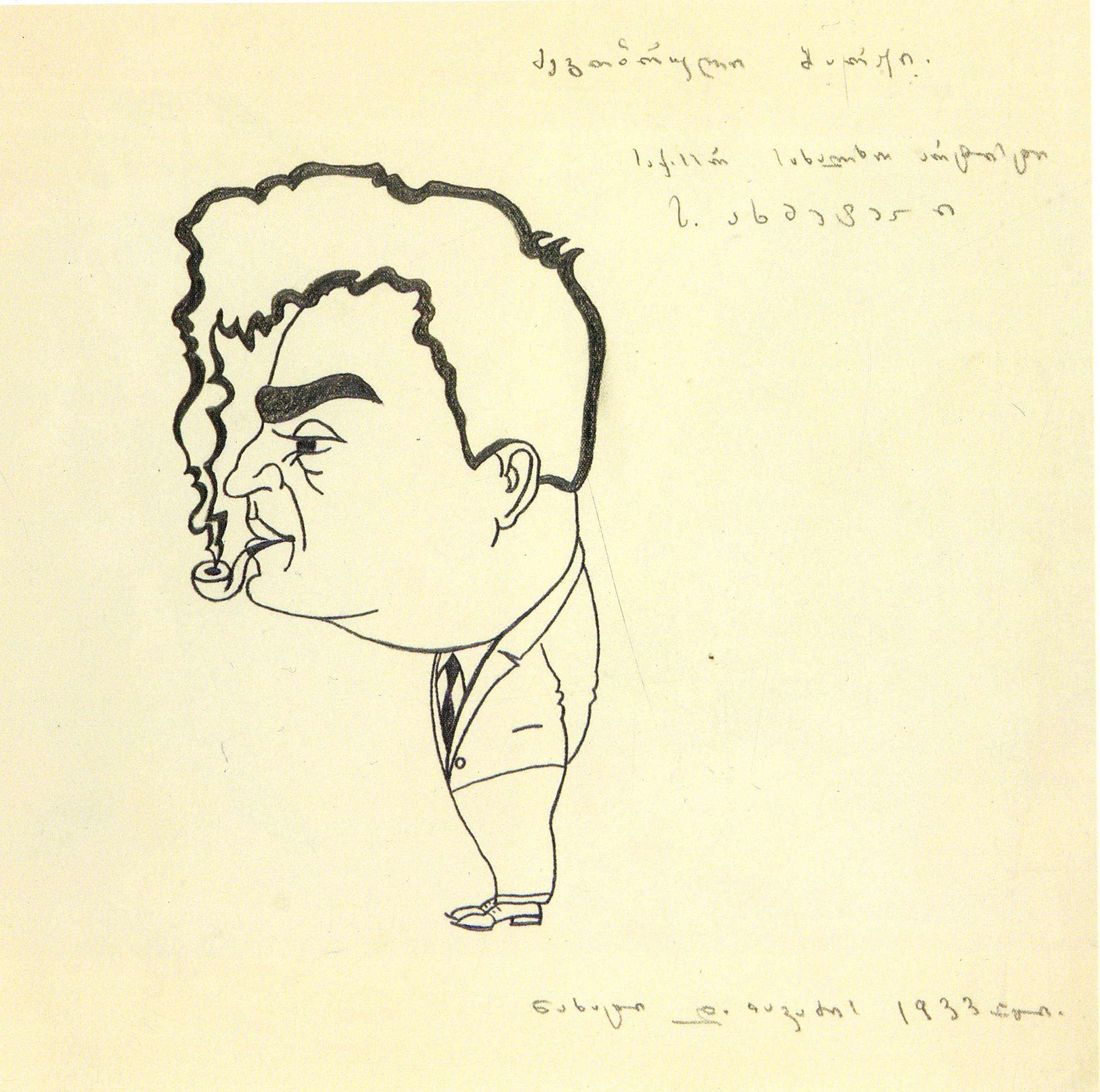
1933; Sandro Akhmeteli (Caricature)

Tavadze was awarded the "Honored Art worker" (1950), the "Laureate of the State Prize" (1951), and the "People's Painter of Georgia" (1967). Starting 1933, Tavadze participated in a number of exhibitions. Tavadze's works were displayed numerous times in Tbilisi, as well as in Moscow (1937, 1956, 1957, 1958, 1967, 1971, 1979), in Leningrad (1937), in São Paulo (1967) and in the German Democratic Republic (1968). He had personal exhibitions in Tbilisi (1964, 1975 ["Shakespeareana"], 1982) and in Moscow (1971).

Tavadze's works are preserved in the Bakhrushin Theatre Museum, Moscow, the National Pushkin Museum, Saint Petersburg, the Georgian State Museum of Theatre, Music, Cinema and Choreography, Tbilisi, and the Museum of Rustaveli Theatre. In addition, some works are preserved in theatres and private collections around the world.

== Works ==
=== Shota Rustaveli State Academic Theatre ===
- 1932 – P. Samsonidze, "The Hoop" (Georgian: "სალტე"). Dir.: Sandro Akhmeteli, Shota Aghsabadze
- 1933 – G. Shatberashvili, "The Enemy" (Georgian: "დუშმანი"). Dir.: Sandro Akhmeteli, Shota Aghsabadze
- 1936 – S. Kldiashvili, "The Autumn Gentry" (Georgian: "შემოდგომის აზნაურები"). Dir.: Kukuri Pataridze
- 1937 –
  - G. Mdivani, "Alkazar" (Georgian: "ალკაზარი"). Dir.: Dimitri Aleksidze
  - S. Kldiashvili, "The Generation of the Heroes" (Georgian: "გმირთა თაობა"). Dir.: Kukuri Pataridze
- 1938 – G. Mdivani, "The Motherland" (Georgian: "სამშობლო"). Dir.: Dimitri Aleksidze
- 1939 – S. Mtvaradze, "Upon the Mountain Range" (Georgian: "მთაგრეხილზე"). Dir.: Dimitri Aleksidze
- 1940 – S. Kldiashvili, "The Widow of an Earl" (Georgian: "გრაფის ქვრივი"). Dir.: Dimitri Aleksidze
- 1941 –
  - S. Kldiashvili, "The Last Knight" (Georgian: "უკანასკნელი რაინდი"). Dir.: Akaki Vasadze
  - F. Wolf, "Professor Mamlock". Dir.: Dimitri Aleksidze
- 1946 –
  - C. Goldoni, "Servant of Two Masters" (Italian: "Il servitore di due padroni"). Dir.: Dimitri Aleksidze
  - G. Berdzenishvili, "Beginning of the End" (Georgian: "დასასრულის დასაწყისი"). Dir.: Akaki Vasadze, Sergo Chelidze
  - B. Chirskov, "The Winners" (Russian: "Победители"). Dir.: Sergo Chelidze
- 1947 –
  - Ar. d'Usseau and J. Gow, "Deep Are the Roots". Dir.: Dimitri Aleksidze
  - N. Pogodin, "The Man with a Rifle" (Russian: "Человек с ружьём"). Dir.: Akaki Vasadze
  - O. Goldsmith, "She Stoops to Conquer". Dir.: Shota Meskhi
- 1948 –
  - S. Dolidze, G. Berdzenishvili, "The Aerie" (Georgian: "არწივის ბუდე"). Dir.: Akaki Vasadze
  - W. Shakespeare, "Othello". Dir.: Akaki Vasadze, Shota Aghsabadze
  - V. Mass, M. Chervinsky, "To Friends, to Comrade" (Russian: "О друзьях-товарищах"). Dir.: Shota Meskhi
- 1949 –
  - I. Mosashvili, "The Sunk Stones" (Georgian: "ჩაძირული ქვები"). Dir.: Akaki Vasadze
  - V. Pataraia, "Ucha Uchardia" (Georgian: "უჩა უჩარდია"). Dir.: Akaki Vasadze
  - V. Karsanidze, "Evergreen Ridges" (Georgian: "მარად მწვანე ქედები"). Dir.: Mikheil Tumanishvili
  - K. Simonov, "Alien shadow" (Russian: "Чужая тень"). Dir.: Dimitri Aleksidze
- 1950 –
  - Sh. Dadiani, "Out of Sparks" (Georgian: "ნაპერწკლიდან"). Dir.: Akaki Vasadze
  - V. Vishnevski, "Unforgettable 1919" (Russian: "Незабываемый 1919-й"). Dir.: Micheil Tumanishvili
- 1951 – G. Mdivani, "People of Goodwill" (Georgian: "კეთილი ნების ადამიანები"). Dir.: Shota Meskhi
- 1952 –
  - P. Kakabadze, "The Forge of Happiness" (Georgian: "ბედნიერი სამჭედლო"). Dir.: Akaki Vasadze
  - D. Kldiashvili, "The Adversity of Darispan" (Georgian: "დარისპანის გასაჭირი"). Dir.: Akaki Vasadze
  - N. Gogol, "The Gamblers" (Georgian: "Игроки"). Dir.: Akaki Dvalishvili
  - I. Vakeli, "The Steel" (Georgian: "რვალი"). Dir.: Shota Meskhi
  - I. Chavchavadze, G. Berdzenishvili, "Otar's Widow" (Georgian: "ოთარაანთ ქვრივი"). Dir.: Akaki Vasadze
- 1953 – A. Sumbatashvili-Yuzhin, "The Betrayal" (Russian: "Измена"). Dir.: Akaki Khorava
- 1954 –
  - I. Dubois, "Haiti". Dir.: Akaki Vasadze, Mikheil Tumanishvili
  - V. Kandelaki, "The Weed" (Georgian: "სარეველა"). Dir.: Akaki Dvalishvili
  - J. Fletcher and Ph. Massinger, "The Spanish Curate". Dir.: Mikheil Tumanishvili
- 1955 – L. Kiacheli, "Tariel Golua" (Georgian: "ტარიელ გოლუა"). Dir.: Mikheil Tumanishvili
- 1956 – I. Vakeli, "A Busy Man" (Georgian: "საქმიანი კაცი"). Dir.: Mikheil Tumanishvili
- 1957 – A. Pushkin, "Boris Godunov" (Russian: "Борис Годунов"). Dir.: Dimitri Aleksidze
- 1958 –
  - G. Sevastikoglu, "Angela". Dir.: Leila Varsimashvili, Otar Zautashvili
  - Al. Apkhaidze, "The Aragvians" (Georgian: "არაგველები"). Dir.: Archil Chkhartishvili
- 1959 –
  - P. Kakabadze, "Kvarkvare Tutaberi" (Georgian: "ყვარყვარე თუთაბერი"). Dir.: Dimitri Aleksidze
  - P. Kohout, "Such Love" (Czech: "Taková láska"). Dir.: Mikheil Tumanishvili
  - V. Kandelaki, "Once Dead" (Georgian: "ერთხელ დახოცილები"). Dir.: Archil Chkhartishvili
- 1960 –
  - A. Arbuzov, "The Irkutsk Story" (Russian: "Иркутская история"). Dir.: Mikheil Tumanishvili
  - K. Senderbiu, "The Revolt of Women". Dir.: Mikheil Tumanishvili
- 1961 –
  - V. Kandelaki, "The Lights of Kartli" (Georgian: "ქართლის ჩირაღდნები"). Dir: Dodo Antadze
  - G. Khukhashvili, "The Sea Children" (Georgian: "ზღვის შვილები"). Dir.: Mikheil Tumanishvili
- 1962 –
  - L. Sanikidze, "The Kutaisians" (Georgian: "ქუთათურები"). Dir: Dodo Antadze
  - C. Goldoni, "The Mistress of the Inn" (Italian: "La locandiera"). Dir.: Mikheil Tumanishvili
  - O. Ioseliani, "Once a Person is Born" (Georgian: "ადამიანი იბადება ერთხელ"). Dir.: Dimitri Aleksidze
- 1963 –
  - W. Gibson, "The Miracle Worker". Dir.: Sandro Mrevlishvili
  - V. Rozov, "Before Dinner" (Russian: "Перед ужином"). Dir.: Robert Sturua
- 1964 – W. Shakespeare, "A Midsummer Night's Dream". Dir.: Mikheil Tumanishvili
- 1965 –
  - I. L. Caragiale, "The Lost Letter" (Romanian: "O scrisoare pierdută"). Dir.: Merab Jaliashvili
  - N. Aziani, "The Last Masquerade" (Georgian: "უკანასკნელი მასკარადი"). Dir.: Gizo Jordania
- 1967 – L. Kiacheli, "Gvadi Bigva" (Georgian: "გვადი ბიგვა"). Dir.: Mikheil Tumanishvili
- 1969 – O. Ioseliani, "Until the Ox-Cart Turns Over" (Georgian: "სანამ ურემი გადაბრუნდება"). Dir.: Mikheil Tumanishvili, Carlo Sakandelidze

==== Not-implemented settings ====
1930 – P. Samsonidze, "Director" (Georgian: "დირექტორი")
1931 – I. Kantaria, "Cholipa" (Georgian: "ჭოლიფა")
1933 – I. Kantaria, "Berikaoba" (Georgian: "ბერიკაობა")
1946 – G. Eristavi, "Separation" (Georgian: "გაყრა")
1952 – A. Lipovsky, "Mayakovsky" (Russian: "Революцией призванный")
1959 – P. Kakabadze, "Kvarkvare Tutaberi" (Georgian: "ყვარყვარე თუთაბერი"; Not implemented version)

=== Marjanishvili State Academic Drama Theatre ===
- 1958 –
  - R. Tabukashvili, "The Secretary of the Regional Committee" (Georgian: "რაიკომის მდივანი"). Dir.: Lili Ioseliani
  - M. Baratashvili, "Marine" (Georgian: "მარინე"). Dir.: Leo Shatberashvili, Giga Lortkipanidze

=== Tbilisi Griboedov State Academic Russian Drama Theatre ===
- 1957 – S. Shanshiashvili, "The Mountain Law" (Georgian: "მთის კანონი"). Dir.: Dodo Antadze
- 1961 –
  - O. Chidjavadze, "A Lucky Loser" (Georgian: "ბედნიერი უიღბლო"). Dir.: Abram Rubin
  - Gr. Abashidze, "A Journey into Three Epochs" (Georgian: "მოგზაურობა სამ დროში"). Dir.: Abram Rubin
- 1964 – L. Chubabria, K. Chavchanidze, "The First Step" (Georgian: "პირველი ნაბიჯი"). Dir.: Konstantin Surmava
- 1965 –
  - K. Buachidze, "Story of Love" (Georgian: "ამბავი სიყვარულისა"). Dir.: Abram Rubin
  - M. Mrevlishvili, "Destiny of the Poet" (Georgian: "პოეტის ბედი"). Dir.: Abram Rubin
  - K. Buachidze, "Remember our Youth" (Georgian: "გავიხსენოთ ჩვენი ახალგაზრდობა"). Dir.: Archil Gomiashvili
- 1966 – G. Mdivani, "Your Uncle Misha" (Georgian: "შენი ძია მიშა"). Dir.: Sergo Chelidze
- 1969 – V. Ejov, "Night of the Nightingale" (Russian: "Соловьиная ночь"). Dir.: Sergo Chelidze

=== Tbilisi Vaso Abashidze Music and Drama State Theatre ===
- 1949 – V. Cagareishvili, "Arsen Odzelashvili" (Georgian: "არსენა ოძელაშვილი"). Dir.: Boris Gamrekeli
- 1950 –
  - Fr. Lehár, "The Merry Widow" (German: "Die lustige Witwe"). Dir.: Dude Dzneladze
  - G. Cabadze, "The Love Song" (Georgian: "სიმღერა სიყვარულზე"). Dir.: Boris Gamrekeli
  - R. Lagidze, "Friends" (Georgian: "მეგობრები"). Dir.: Dude Dzneladze
  - N. Gudiashvili, "Meeting at the Cottage" (Georgian: "შეხვედრა აგარაკზე"). Dir.: Boris Gamrekeli
- 1951 –
  - G. Cabadze, "A bright Future" (Georgian: "ბრწყინვალე მომავალი"). Dir.: Boris Gamrekeli
  - V. Cagareishvili, "The Queen of Tsani" (Georgian: "ცანის დედოფალი"). Dir.: Dude Dzneladze
  - Sh. Milorava, "Once in Spring" (Georgian: "ერთხელ გაზაფხულზე"). Dir.: Ioseb Kutateladze
  - N. Gudiashvili, "Gift" (Georgian: "საჩუქარი"). Dir.: Boris Gamrekeli
- 1956 –
  - I. Jarkovsky, "Love Knot". Dir.: Shota Meskhi
  - A. Kereselidze, "Three Brides" (Georgian: "სამი პატარძალი"). Dir.: Boris Gamrekeli
- 1957 –
  - Sh. Milorava, "Dali" (Georgian: "დალი"). Dir.: Boris Gamrekeli
  - Sh. Azmaiparashvili, "The desirable Groom" (Georgian: "ნანატრი საქმრო"). Dir.: Shota Meskhi
  - R. Lagidze, "Komble" (Georgian: "კომბლე"). Dir.: Boris Gamrekeli
- 1958 – G. Kakhiani, "Bastard" (Georgian: "ნაბიჭვარი"). Dir.: Shota Meskhi
- 1960 –
  - A. Kereselidze, "Arriving from the Moon" (Georgian: "მთვარიდან ჩამოფრენა"). Dir.: Shota Meskhi
  - Sh. Milorava, "Strange Guests" (Georgian: "უცნაური სტუმრები"). Dir.: Boris Gamrekeli
- 1966 – Sh. Azmaiparashvili, "It will never be the same again" (Georgian: "რაც გინახავს ვეღარ ნახავ"). Dir.: Leri Paksashvili
- 1967 – A. Shaverzashvili, "Nino" (Georgian: "ნინო"). Dir.: Shota Meskhi
- 1968 – Sh. Milorava "The Fatal Operation" (Georgian: '"საბედისწერო ოპერაცია"). Dir.: Shota Meskhi
- 1951 – Z. Paliashvili, "Abesalom and Eteri" (Georgian: "აბესალომ და ეთერი"). Dir.: Shota Aghsabadze
- 1952 –
  - S. Rachmaninoff, "Aleko" (Russian: "Алеко"). Dir.: Shota Aghsabadze
  - N. Rimsky-Korsakov, "The Noblewoman Vera Sheloga" (Russian: "Боярыня Вера Шелога"). Dir.: Shota Aghsabadze
- 1953 –
  - P. Tchaikovsky, "Eugene Onegin" (Russian: "Евгений Онегин"). Dir.: Archil Chkhartishvili
  - Ch. Gounod, "Romeo and Juliet". Dir.: Shota Aghsabadze
- 1954 – G. Rossini, "The Barber of Seville" (Italian: "Il barbiere di Siviglia"). Dir.: Shota Aghsabadze
- 1957 – G. Verdi, "La traviata". Dir.: Shota Aghsabadze
- 1959 – R. Gabichvadze, "Nana" (Georgian: "ნანა"). Dir.: Shota Aghsabadze

=== Tbilisi Nodar Dumbadze Professional State Youth Theatre ===
- 1937 –
  - G. Berdzenishvili, "In the Mountains of Adjara" (Georgian: "აჭარის მთებში"). Dir.: Boris Gamrekeli
  - E. Schwarz, "Red Riding Hood". Dir.: Aleksandr Takaishvili
- 1938 –
  - G. Nakhucrishvili, "The Line of Fire" (Georgian: "ცეცხლის ხაზზე"). Dir.: Aleksandr Takaishvili
  - B. Gamrekeli, "Hero" (Georgian: "გმირი"). Dir.: Boris Gamrekeli
  - Molière, "Scapin's Deceits" (French: "Les Fourberies de Scapin"). Dir.: Aleksandr Takaishvili
  - V. Balaban, "Green Valley". Dir.: Giorgi Darispanashvili
- 1939 – A. Tsereteli, "Patara Kakhi" (Georgian: "პატარა კახი"). Dir.: Aleksandr Takaishvili
- 1940 – K. Gogodze, "Kadjana" (Georgian: "ქაჯანა"). Dir.: Giorgi Darispanashvili
- 1941 –
  - G. Nakhucrishvili, "Achakune" (Georgian: "აჩაკუნე"). Dir.: Aleksandr Takaishvili
  - Sh. Kutshava, "Blue Carpet" (Georgian: "ცისფერი ხალიჩა"). Dir.: Giorgi Jordania
- 1950 – G. Gogichaishvili, "Bright Path" (Georgian: "ნათელი გზა"). Dir.: Otar Aleksishvili
- 1952 – G. Berdzenishvili, "Old Wound" (Georgian: "ძველი ჭრილობა"). Dir.: Otar Aleksishvili
- 1953 – S. Mtvaradze, "Surami Fortress" (Georgian: "სურამის ციხე"'). Dir.: Aleksandr Takaishvili
- 1954 – E. L. Voinitsh, "The Gadfly". Dir.: Iuri Kakulia
- 1956 – G. Nakhucrishvili, "Little Warriors" (Georgian: "პატარა მეომრები"). Dir.: Revaz Tsharkhalashvili
- 1963 – V. Kataev, "A White Sail Gleams" (Russian: "Белеет парус одинокий"). Dir.: Shalva Gatserelia
- 1964 – W. Shakespeare, "Twelfth Night". Dir.: Sergo Chelidze
- 1965 – A. Chkhaidze, "When Childhood Ends" (Georgian: "როცა მთავრდება ბავშვობა"). Dir.: Shalva Gatserelia

=== Tbilisi Youth Russian Theatre ===
- 1970 – A. Kuznetsov, "The Moscow Holidays" (Russian: "Московские каникулы"). Dir. Abram Rubin

=== Tbilisi Petros Adamian State Armenian Drama Theatre ===
- 1956 – M. Mrevlishvili, "Avalanche" (Georgian: "ზვავი"). Dir.: Ferdinand Bjikyan

=== Kutaisi Lado Meskhishvili State Drama Theatre ===
- 1956 – M. Japaridze, "Fellow Countryman" (Georgian: "ჩვენებურები"). Dir.: Akaki Vasadze
- 1958 –
  - A. Sumbatashvili-Yuzhin, "The Betrayal" (Russian: "Измена"). Dir.: Akaki Vasadze
  - Dumanoir and A. d'Ennery, "Don César de Bazan". Dir.: Tamaz Meskhi
- 1959 – K. Lortkipanidze, "The Dawn of Colchis" (Georgian: "კოლხეთის ცისკარი"). Dir.: Akaki Vasadze
- 1960 –
  - V. Daraseli, "Kikvidze" (Georgian: "კიკვიძე"). Dir.: Akaki Vasadze
  - D. Kldiashvili, "Irina’s Happiness" (Georgian: "ირინეს ბედნიერება"). Dir.: Akaki Vasadze
  - L. Sanikidze, "The Kutaisians" (Georgian: "ქუთათურები"). Dir.: Akaki Vasadze
  - P. Kakabadze, "The Farmer's Wedding" (Georgian: "კოლმეურნის ქორწინება"). Dir.: Akaki Vasadze, Tamaz Meskhi
- 1962 –
  - G. Mdivani, "Millions of Guga and Gigo" (Georgian: "გუგასა და გიგოს მილიონები"). Dir.: Tamaz Meskhi
  - P. Kakabadze, "The Wheel of Life" (Georgian: "ცხოვრების ჯარა"). Dir.: Akaki Vasadze
  - G. Taktakishvili, "A White Bat" (Georgian: "თეთრი ღამურა"). Dir.: Tamaz Meskhi
- 1963 – M. Japaridze, "Bughara" (Georgian: "ბუღარა"). Dir.: Otar Aleksishvili
- 1965 – Sh. Dadiani, "Yesterday's People" (Georgian: "გუშინდელნი"). Dir.: Akaki Vasadze

=== Batumi Ilia Chavchavadze State Drama Theatre ===
- 1937 – G. Mdivani, "The Blind" (Georgian: "ბრმა"). Dir.: Dimitri Aleksidze
- 1938 –
  - S. Mtvaradze, "Tevrath" (Georgian: "თევრათ"). Dir.: Archil Chkhartishvili
  - S. Shanshiashvili, "Arsena" (Georgian: "არსენა"). Dir.: Archil Chkhartishvili
  - P. Kakabadze, "The Farmer's Wedding" (Georgian: "კოლმეურნის ქორწინება"). Dir.: Archil Chkhartishvili
- 1953 –
  - G. Mdivani, "Bagration" (Georgian: "ბაგრატიონი"). Dir.: Shota Meskhi
  - M. Mrevlishvili, "Baratashvili" (Georgian: "ბარათაშვილი"). Dir.: Shota Meskhi
- 1954 – H. Fast, "Freedom Road". Dir.: Shota Meskhi

=== Gori Giorgi Eristavi State Drama Theatre ===
- 1963 – L. Milorava, "Curved Staircase" (Georgian: "მრუდე კიბე"). Dir.: Giorgi Abramishvili
- 1970 – G. Nakhucrishvili, "Ali Baba". Dir.: Otar Aleksishvili

=== Chiatura Akaki Tsereteli State Drama Theatre ===
- 1966 – G. Nakhicrishvili, "Shaithan Khikho" (Georgian: "შაითან ხიხო"). Dir.: Otar Aleksishvili
- 1970 – A. Getsadze, "Saba Sulkhan" (Georgian: "საბა სულხანი"). Dir.: Vladimer Modebadze
- 1974 – G. Nakhucrishvili, "Komble" (Georgian: "კომბლე"). Dir.: Solomon Kipshidze
- 1975 – L. Kiacheli, "Tariel Golua" (Georgian: "ტარიელ გოლუა"). Dir.: Solomon Kipshidze
- 1976 –
  - Lope de Vega, "The Gardener's Dog" (Spanish: "El perro del Hortelano"). Dir.: Solomon Kipshidze
  - Molière, "The Doctor in Spite of Himself" (French: "Le Médecin malgré lui"). Dir.: Solomon Kipshidze

=== Meskheti State Drama Theatre ===
- 1971 – P. Kakabadze, "The Farmer's Wedding" (Georgian: "კოლმეურნის ქორწინება"). Dir.: Alexandr Mikeladze

=== Tskhinvali Kosta Khetagurov State Drama Theatre ===
- 1968 – Sophocles,"Oedipus Rex" (Ancient Greek: "Οἰδίπους Τύραννος"). Dir.: Archil Chkhartishvili

=== Moscow Pushkin Drama Theatre ===
- 1955 – G. Kelbakiani, "The Young Teacher" (Georgian: "ახალგაზრდა მასწავლებელი"). Dir.: Dimitri Aleksidze

=== Kiev Lesya Ukrainka National Academic Theatre of Russian Drama ===
- 1954 – M. Baratashvili, "Dragonfly" (Georgian: "ჭრიჭინა"). Dir.: Irina Molostova

=== Azerbaijan State Academic Drama Theatre ===
- 1972 – N. Dumbadze, "Do not worry, Mom" (Georgian: "ნუ გეშინია, დედა"). Dir.: Agakishi Kazimov
- 1977 – N. Hikmet, "The Legend of Love". Dir.: Alesker Sharifov

=== Kirovabad Jafar Jabbarly Theatre ===
- 1933 – W. Shakespeare, "Otello". Dir.: Shota Agsabadze
- 1968 – N. Mamedov, "Tariel". Dir.: Yusuf Bagirov
- 1972 – W. Shakespeare, "Otello". Dir.: Yusuf Bagirov
- 1973 – A. Mamedov, "When the Stars are Meeting". Dir.: Yusuf Bagirov
- 1976 – Sophocles, "Antigone". Dir.: Yusuf Bagirov
- 1980 – W. Shakespeare, "Richard III". Dir.: Yusuf Bagirov
- 1983 – M. Karim, "Do not Break the fire, Prometheus!". Dir.: Yusuf Bagirov

=== Avar Music and Drama Theatre ===
1960 –

- K. Zakaryaev, M. Daudov, "Along the Mountain Roads". Dir.: Archil Chkhartishvili
- R. Gamzatov, "The Mountain Girl". Dir.: Archil Chkhartishvili

=== Georgian State Television 1-st Channel ===
- 1978 – D. Kldiashvili, "Adversity of Darispan" (Georgian: "დარისპანის გასაჭირი"). Dir.: Micheil Tumanishvili

=== Projects ===
- 1963 – W. Shakespeare, "Macbeth"
- 1965 – W. Shakespeare, "Otello"
- 1970 – W. Shakespeare, "King Lear"
- 1974 –
- W. Shakespeare, "Hamlet"
- W. Shakespeare, "Julius Caesar"
- W. Shakespeare, "Romeo and Juliet"
- 1985 – H. Ibsen, "Peer Gynt"

== Awards ==
- Stalin Prize (1951)
- Honored visual artist of the Georgian SSR (1967)
- Honored worker of Arts of the Georgian SSR (1950)
- Order of the Red Banner of Labor (17 April 1958)

== Gallery ==
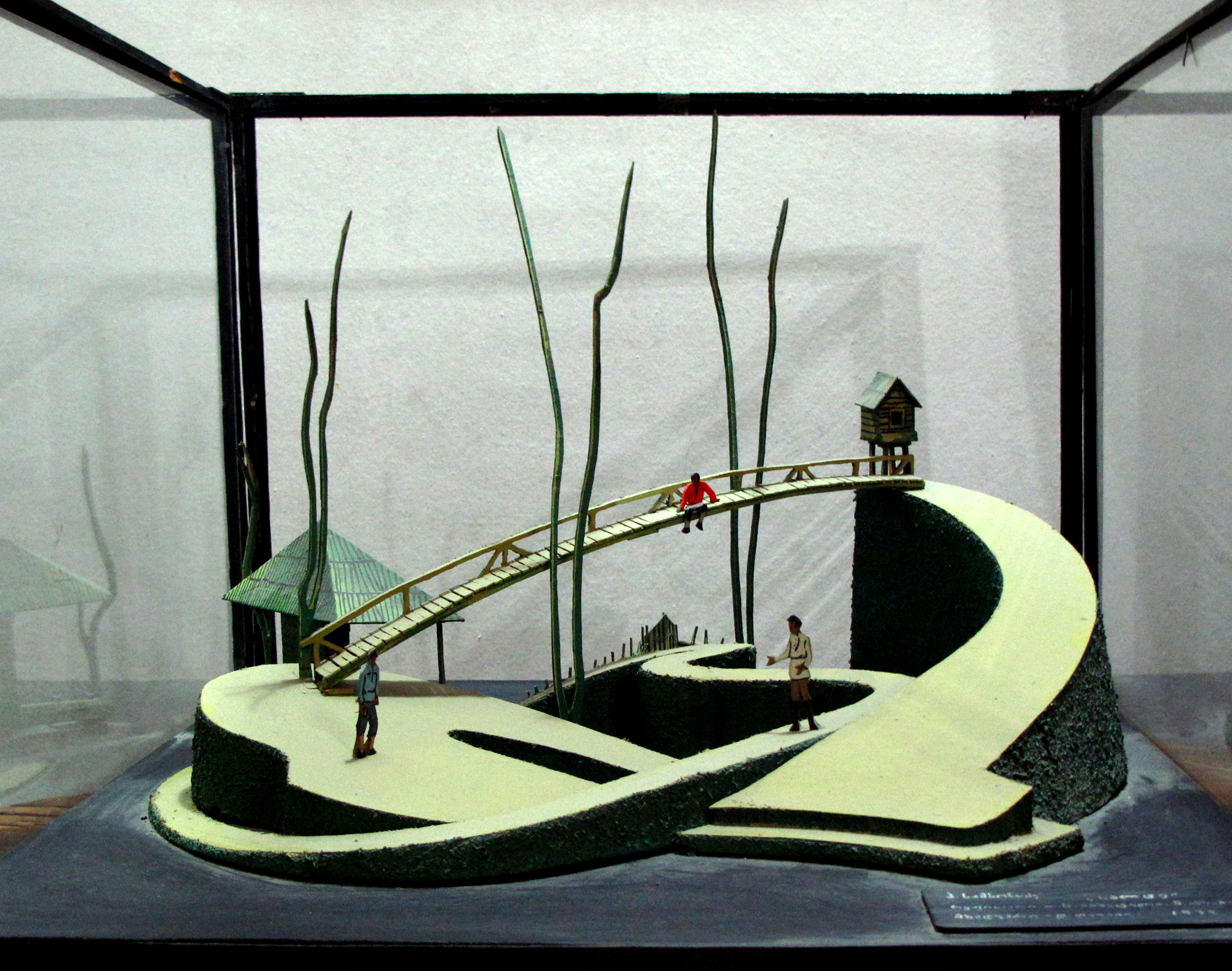
1932; Rustaveli Theatre; Samsonidze – "The Hoop"

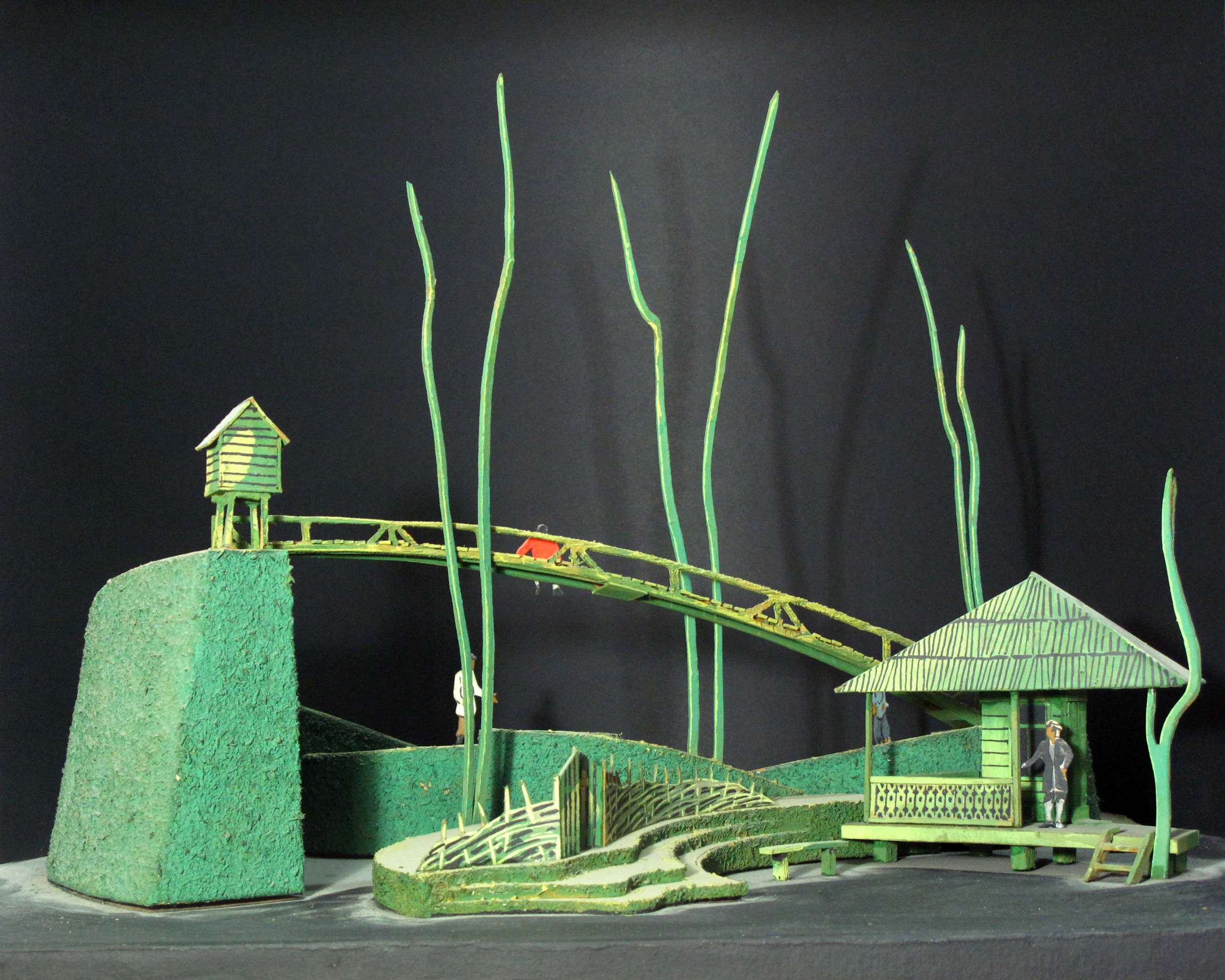
1932; Rustaveli Theatre; Samsonidze – "The Hoop"

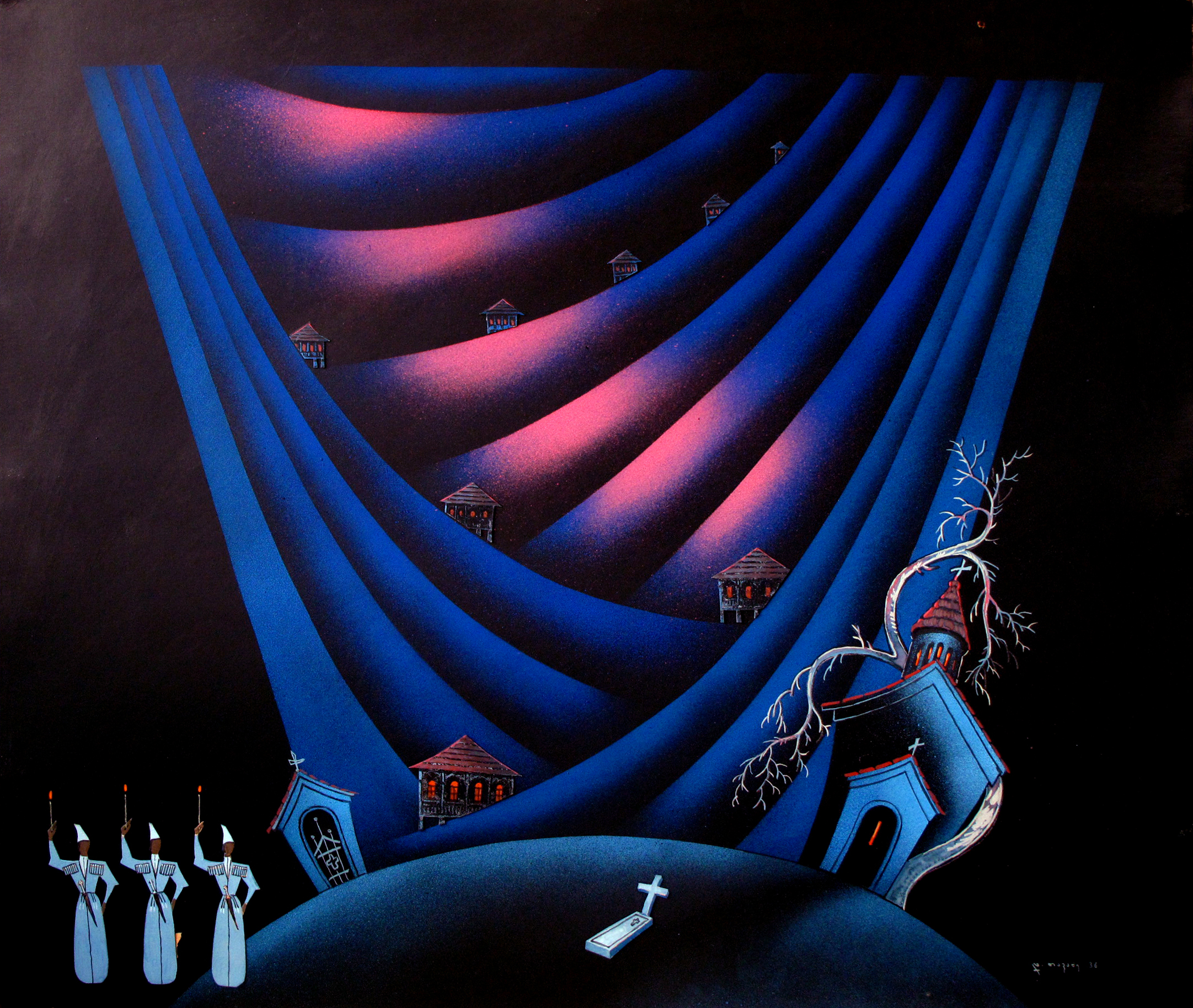
1936; Rustaveli Theatre; Kldiashvili – "The Autumn Gentry"

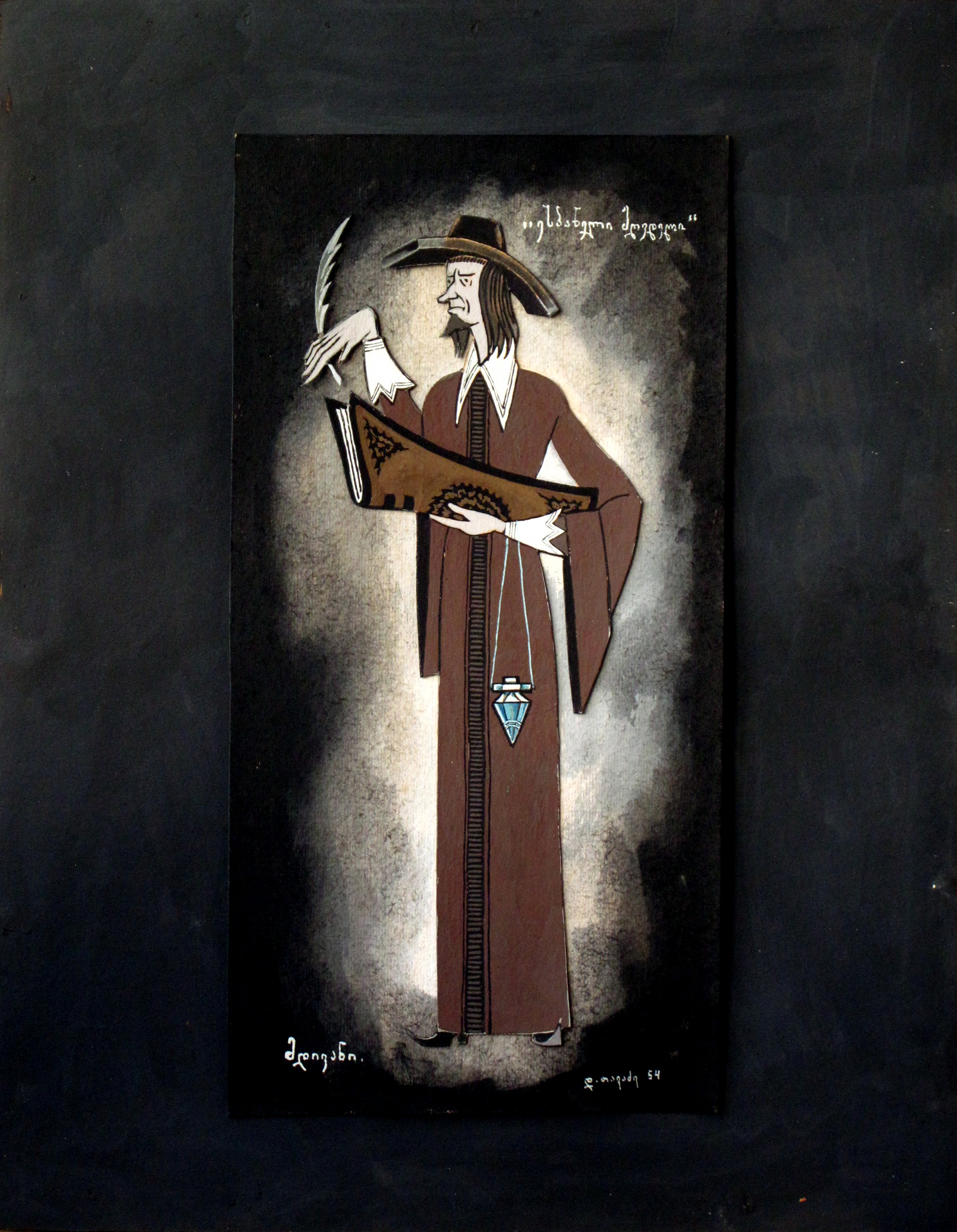
1954; Rustaveli Theatre; Fletcher, Massinger – "The Spanish Curate"

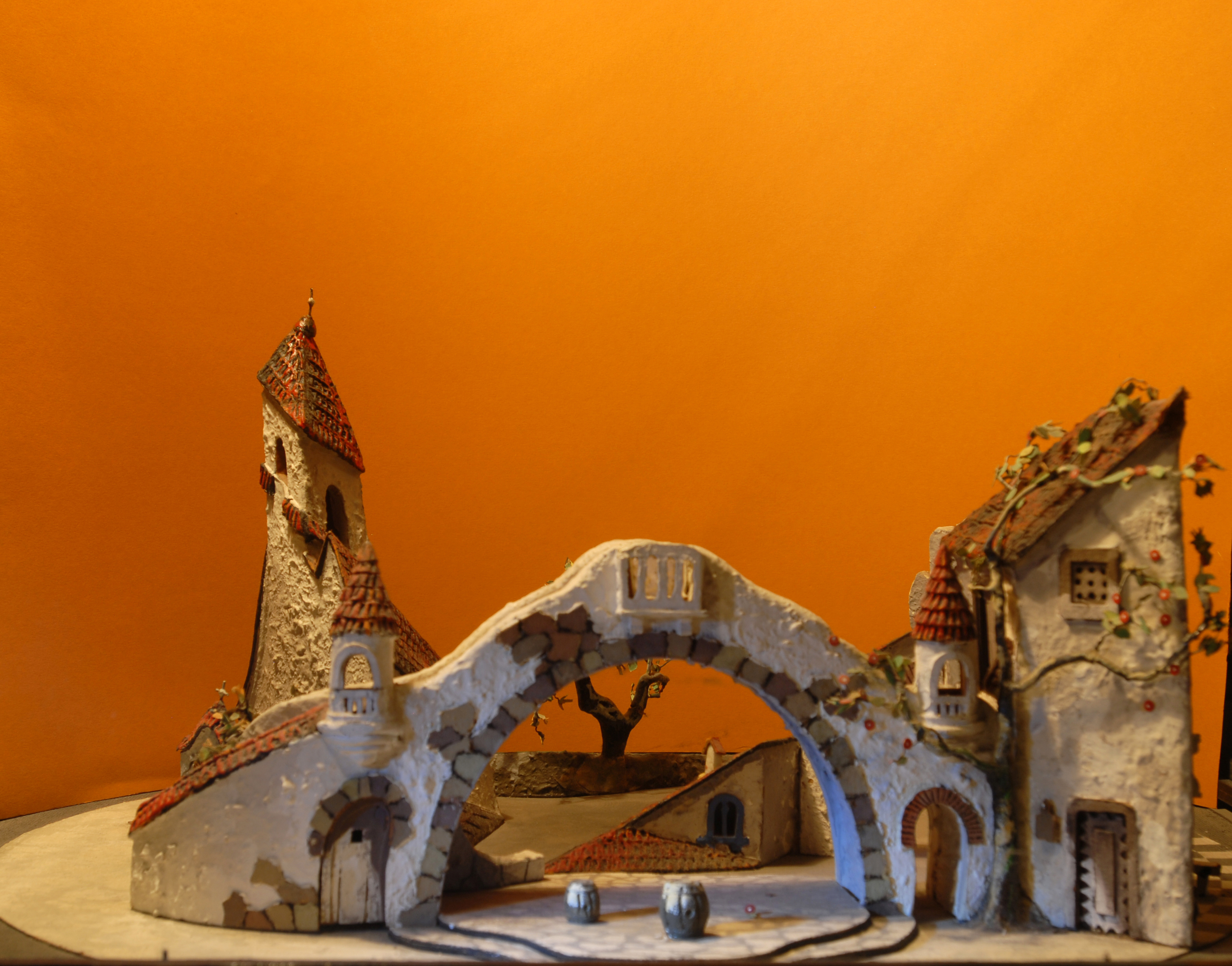
1954; Rustaveli Theatre; Fletcher, Massinger – "The Spanish Curate"

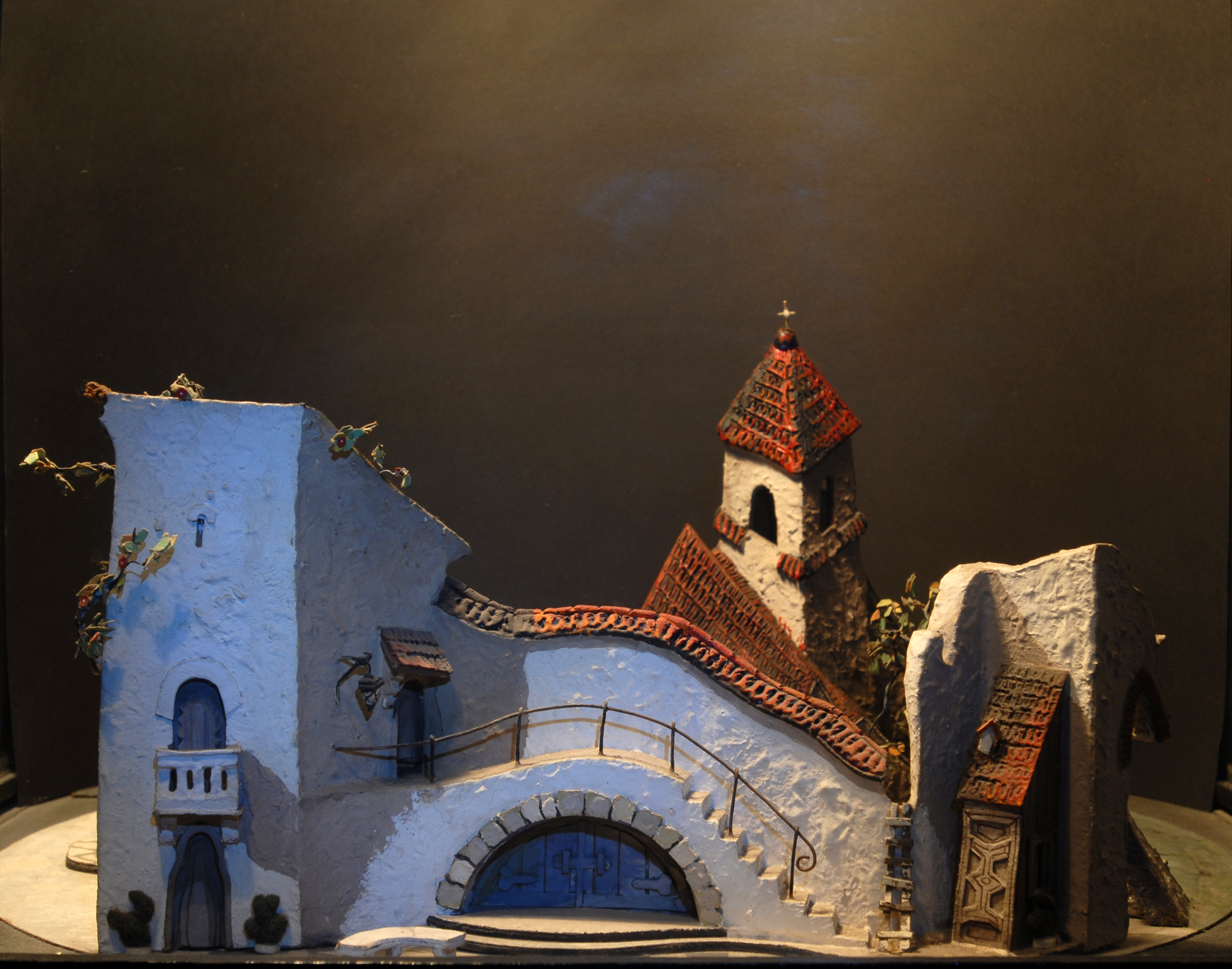
1954; Rustaveli Theatre; Fletcher, Massinger – "The Spanish Curate"

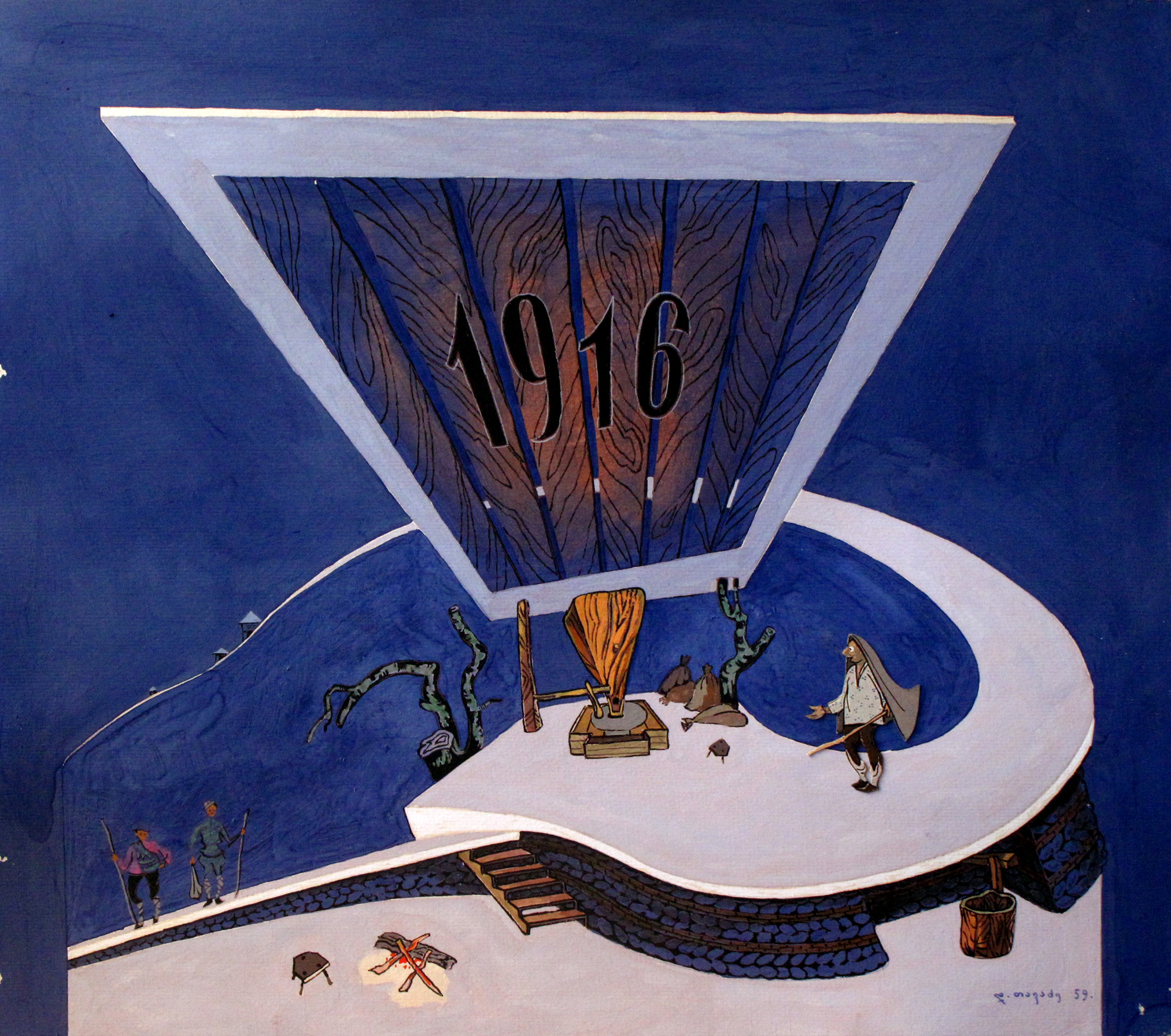
1959; Rustaveli Theatre; Kakabadze – "Kvarkvare Tutaberi"

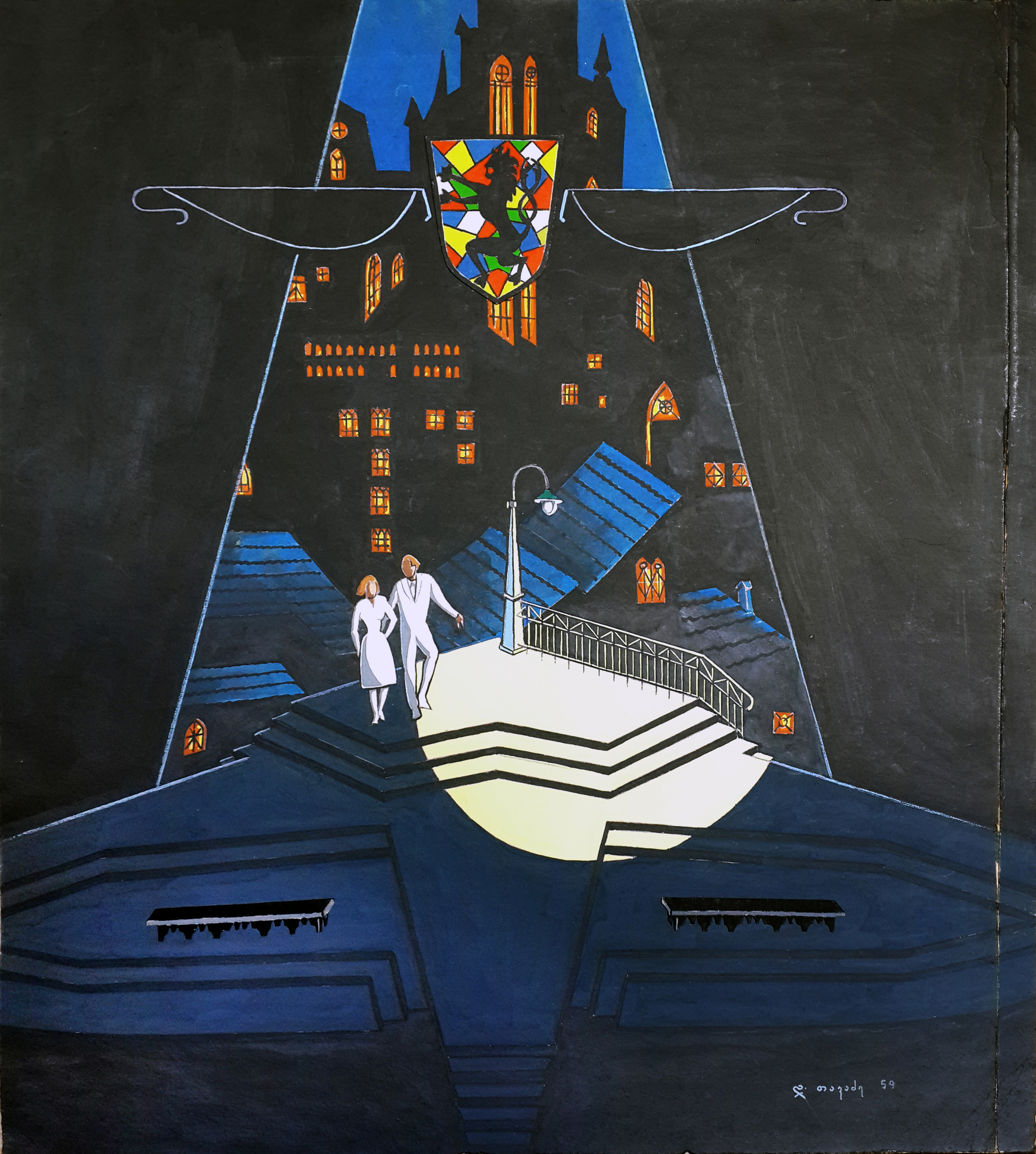
1959; Rustaveli Theatre; Kohout – "Such Love" (Stored at Rustaveli Theater Museum)

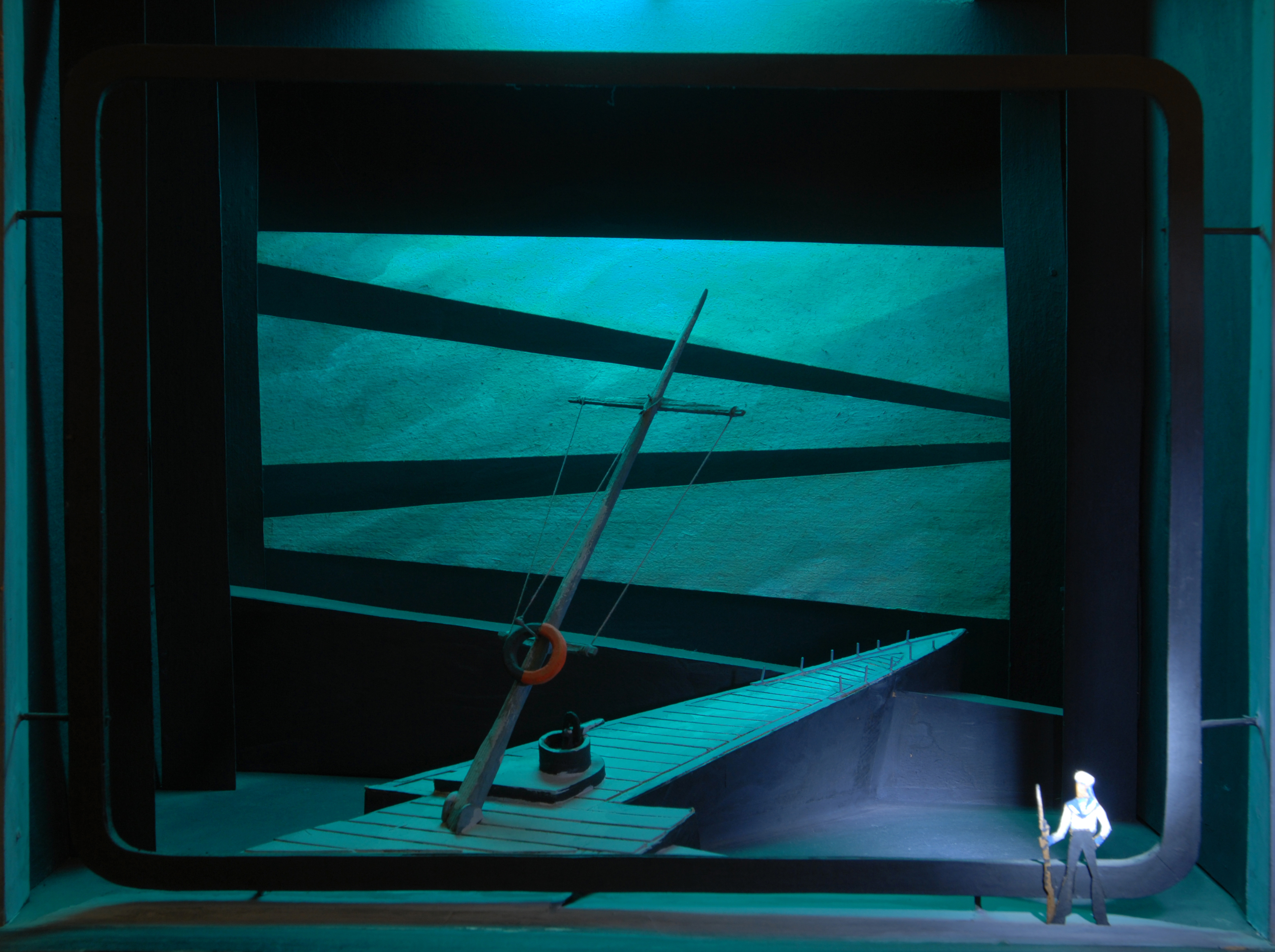
1961; Rustaveli Theatre; Khukhashvili – "The Sea Children"

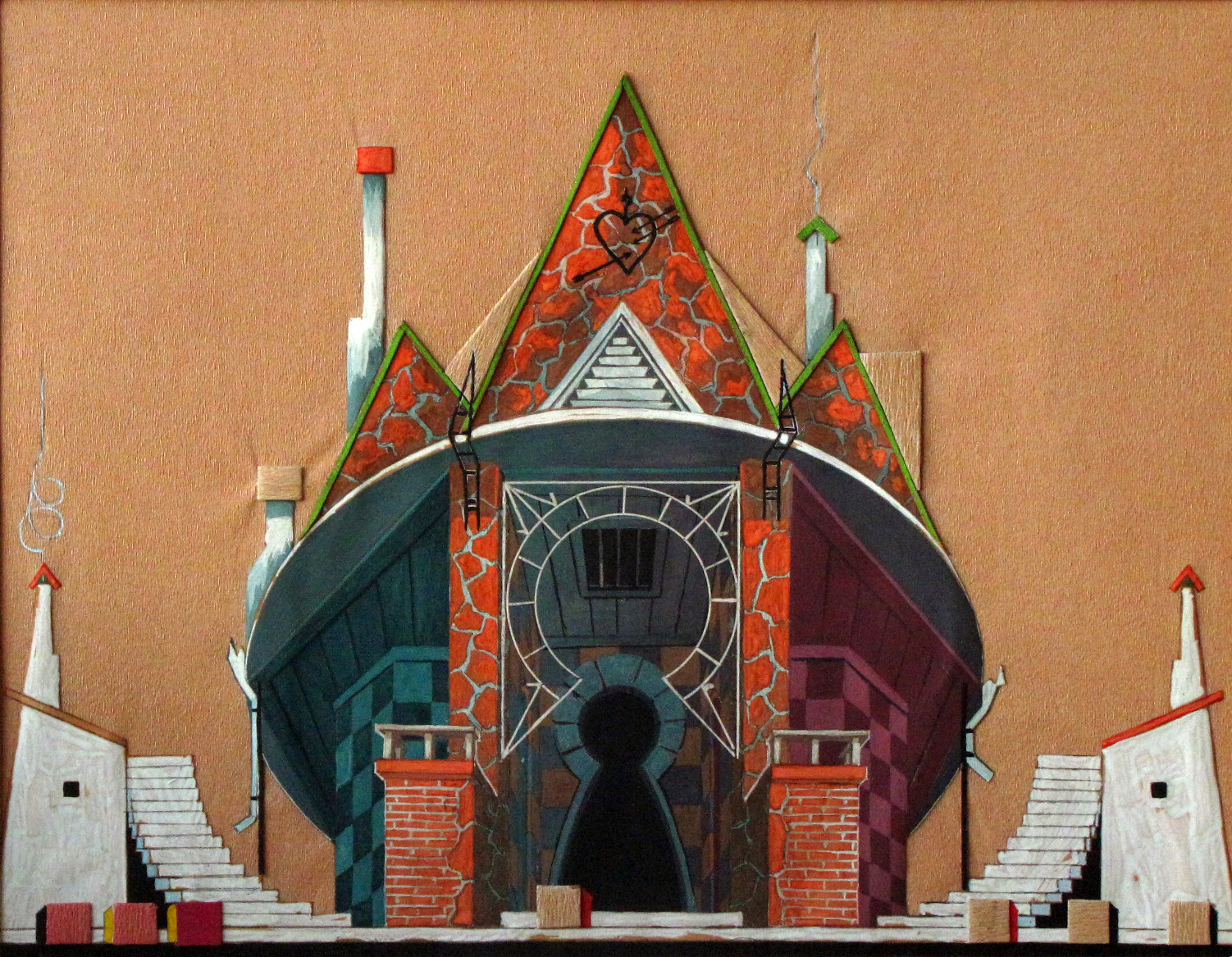
1962; Rustaveli Theatre; Goldoni – "The Mistress of the Inn"

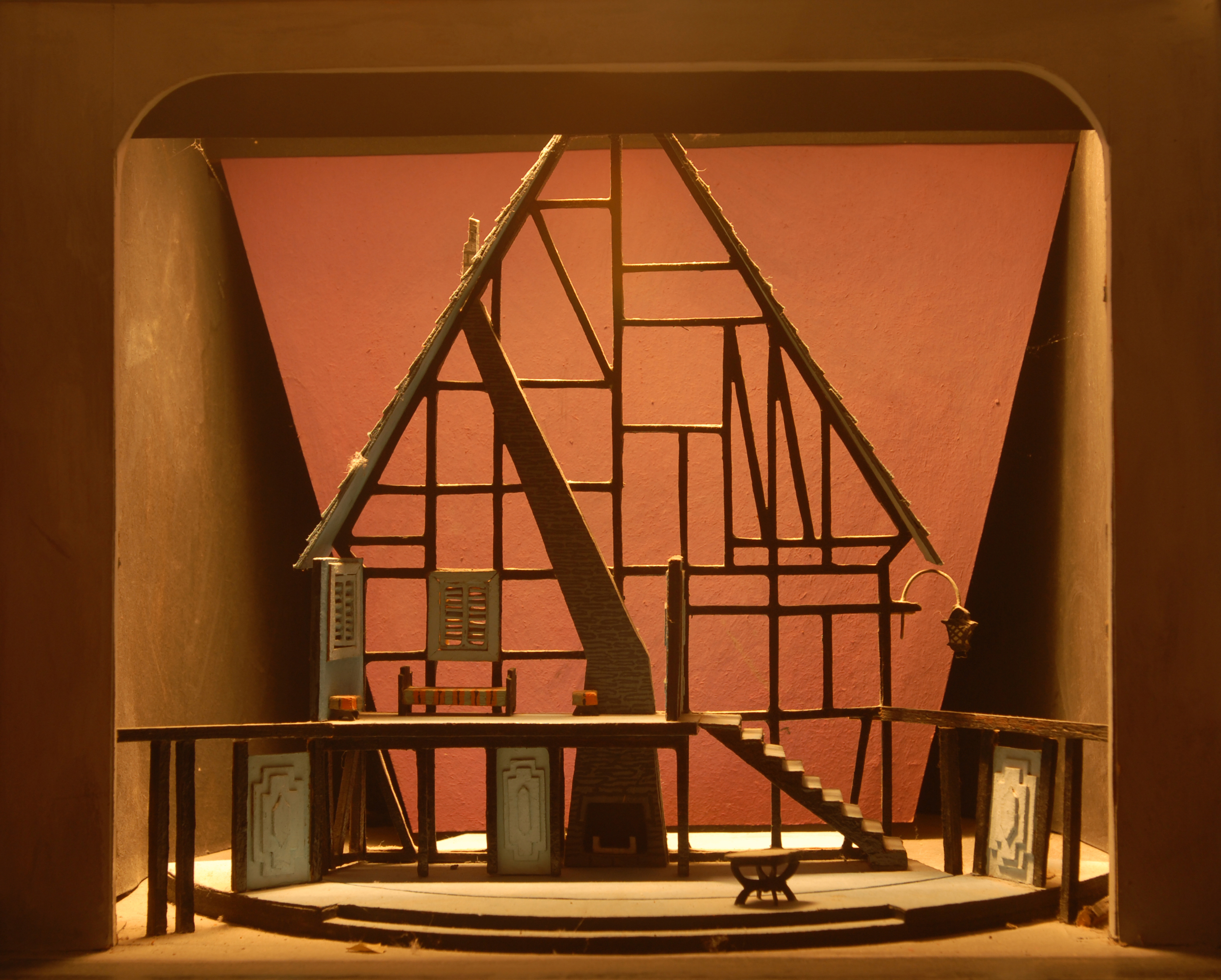
1963; Rustaveli Theatre; Gibson – "The Miracle Worker"

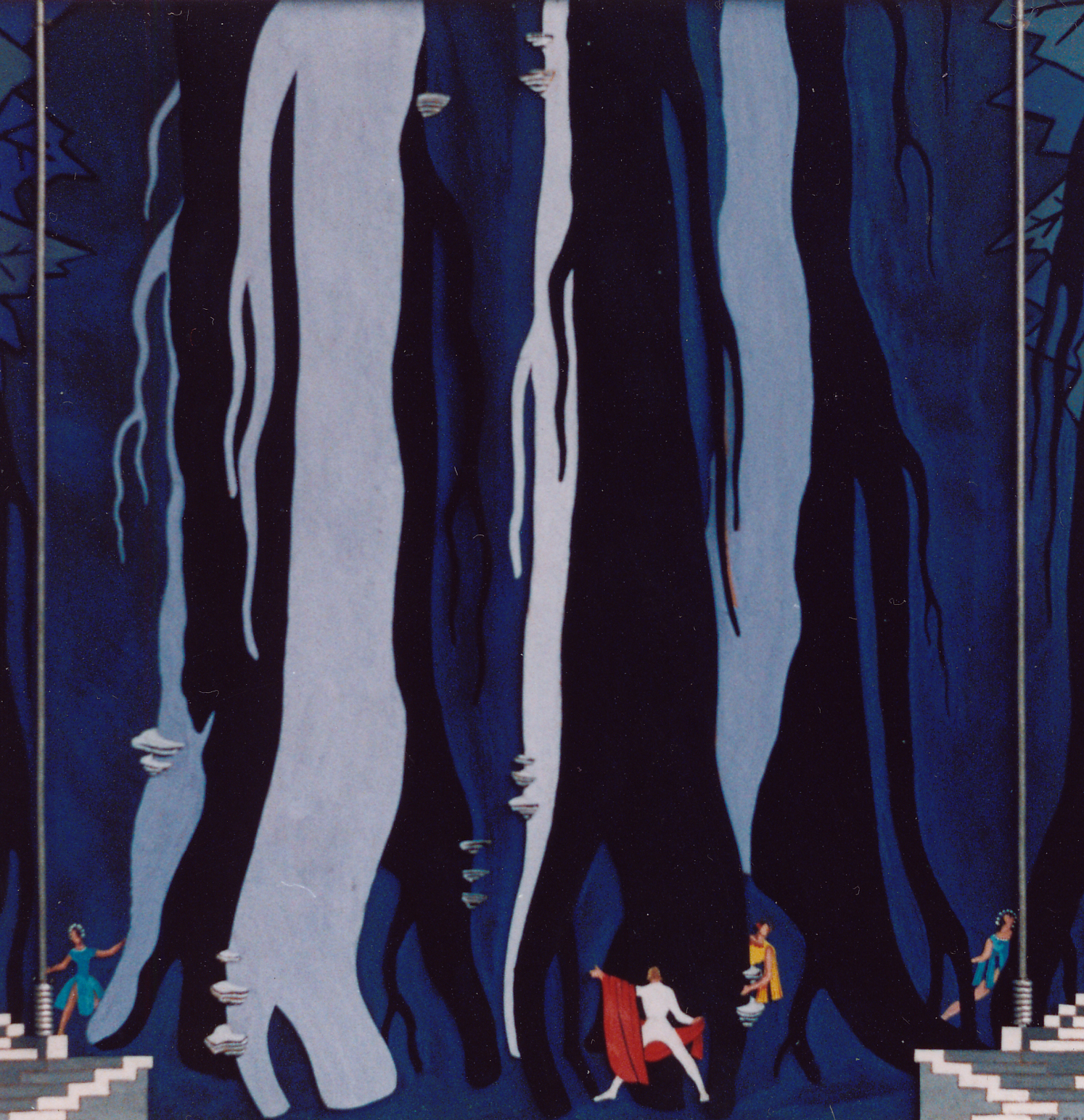
1964; Rustaveli Theatre; Shakespeare – "A Midsummer Night's Dream"

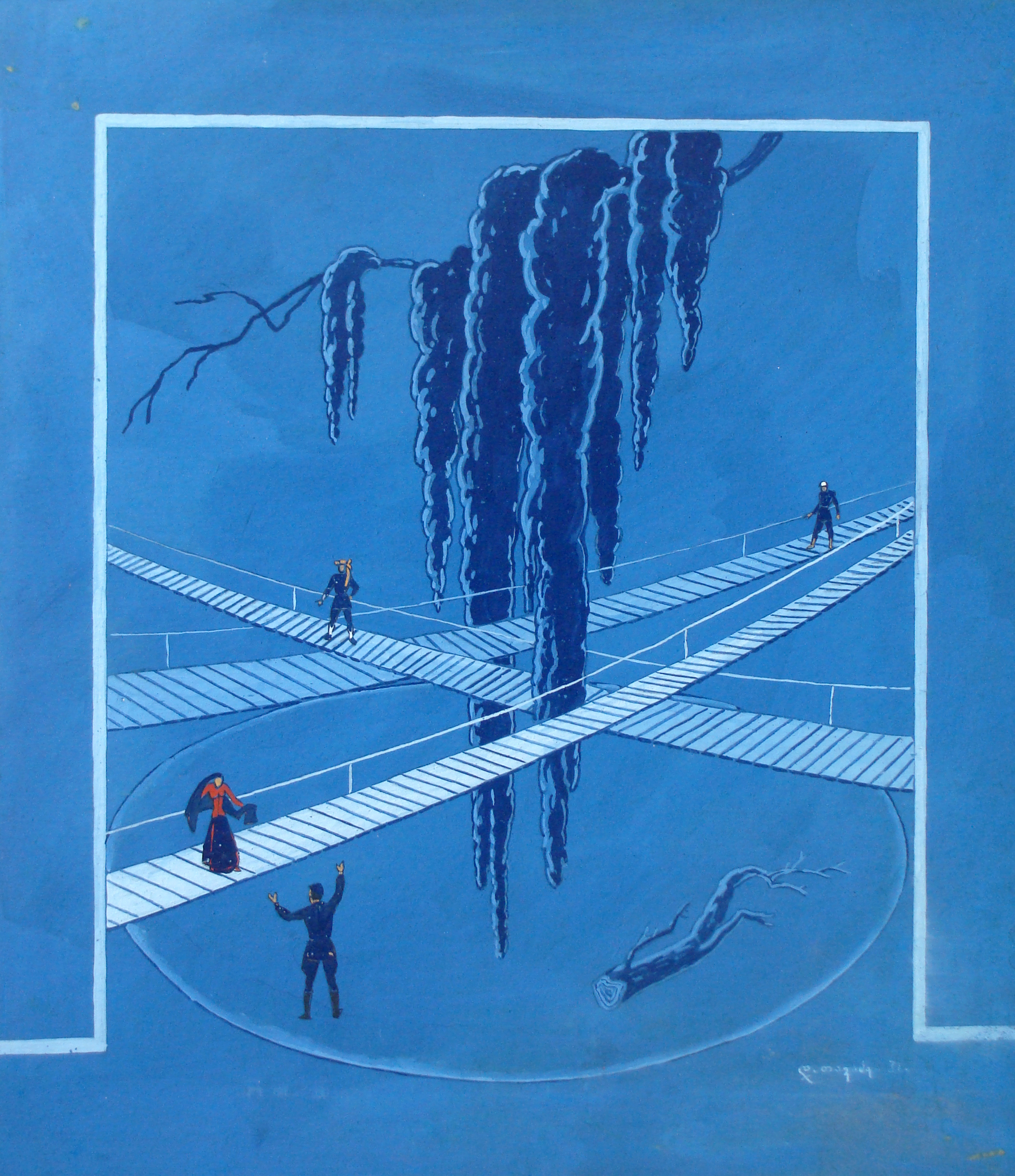
1931; Rustaveli Theatre; Kantaria – "Cholipa" (Not implemented)

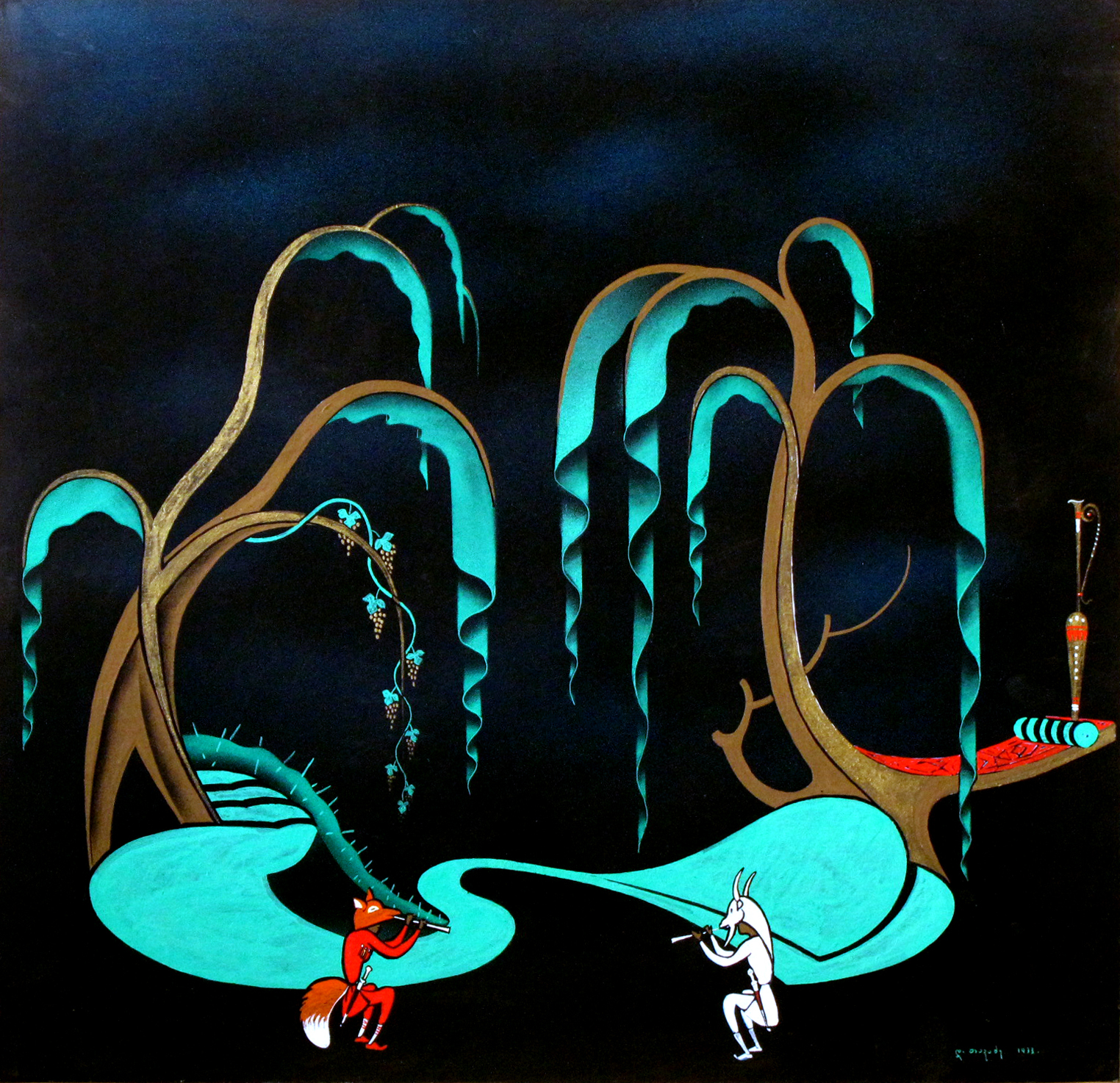
1933; Rustaveli Theatre; Kantaria – "Berikaoba" (Not implemented)

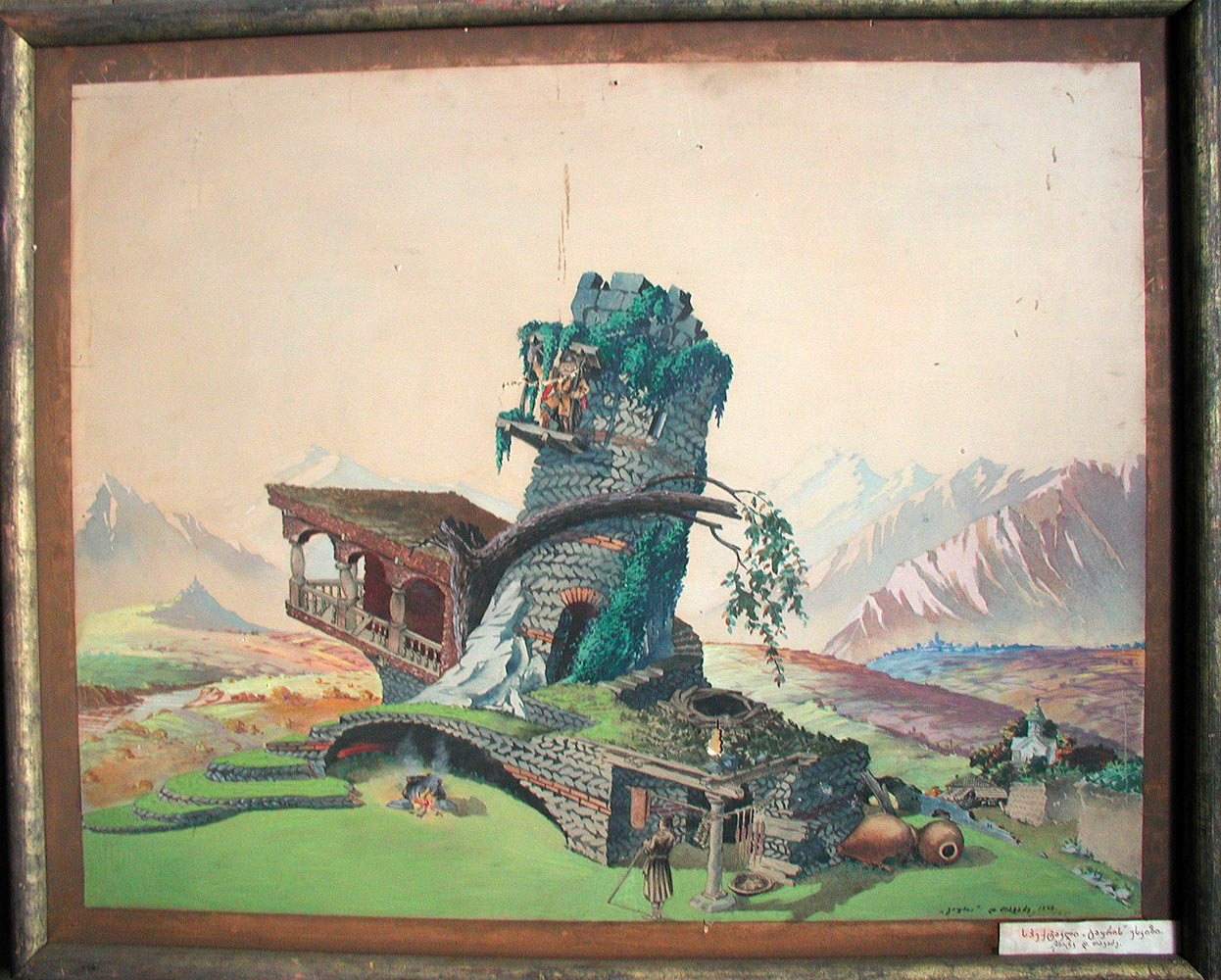
1946; Rustaveli Theatre; G. Eristavi – "Separation" (Not implemented; Stored at Theatre and Cinema Museum)

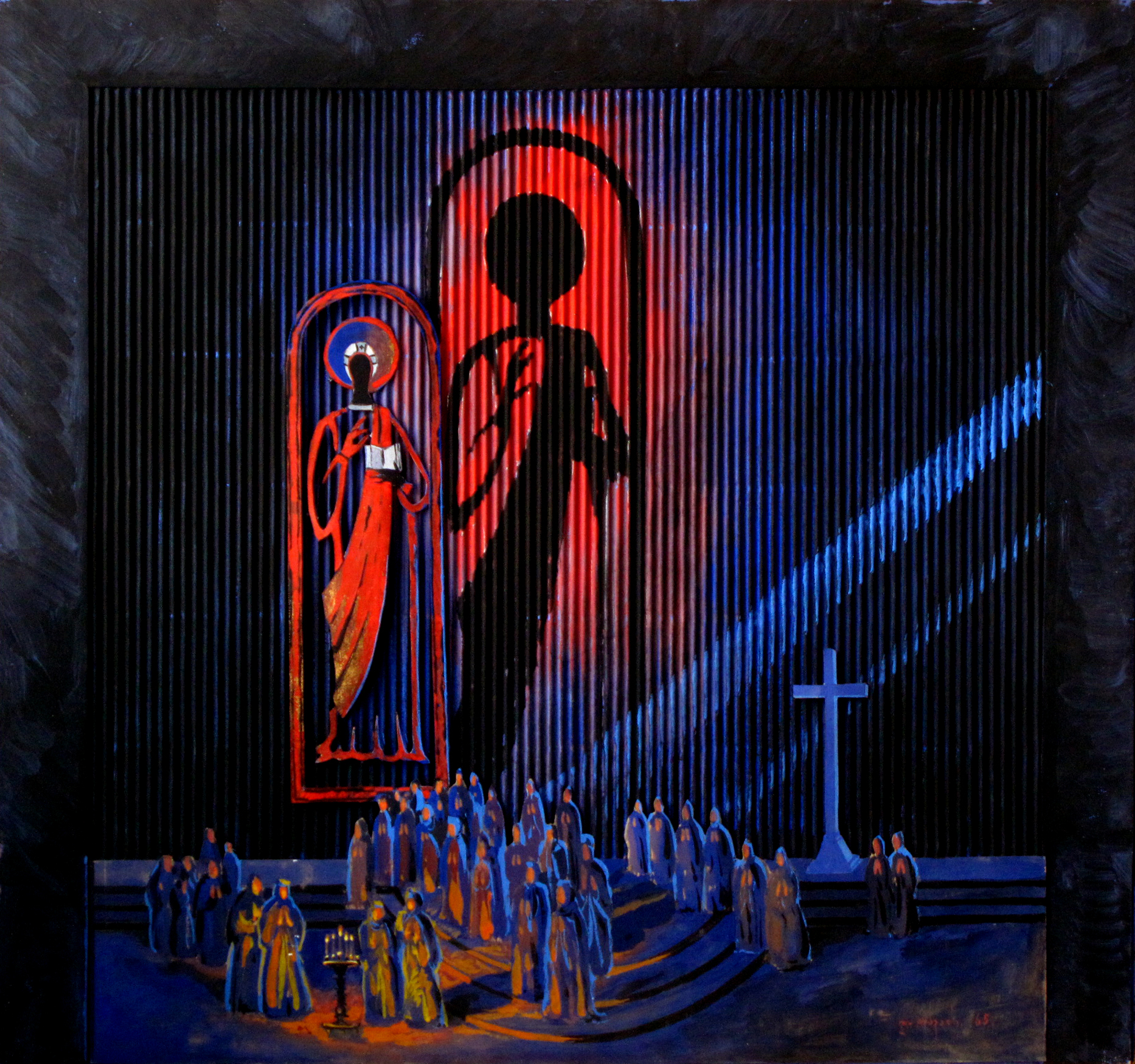
1964; Griboedov Theater; Tchubabria, Tchavtchavadze – "The First Step"

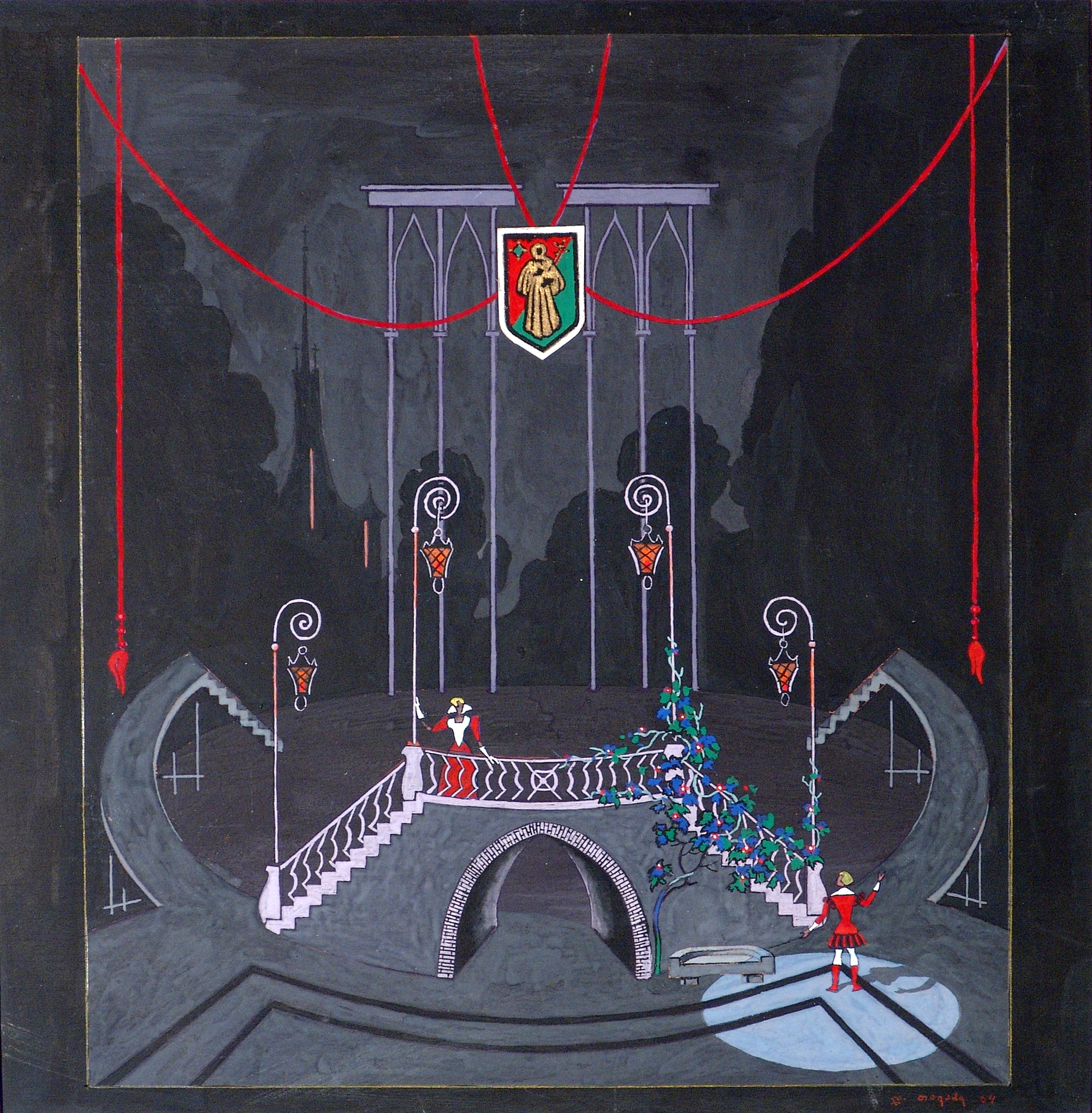
1964; Tbilisi Nodar Dumbadze Professional State Youth Theatre; Shakespeare – "Twelfth Night"

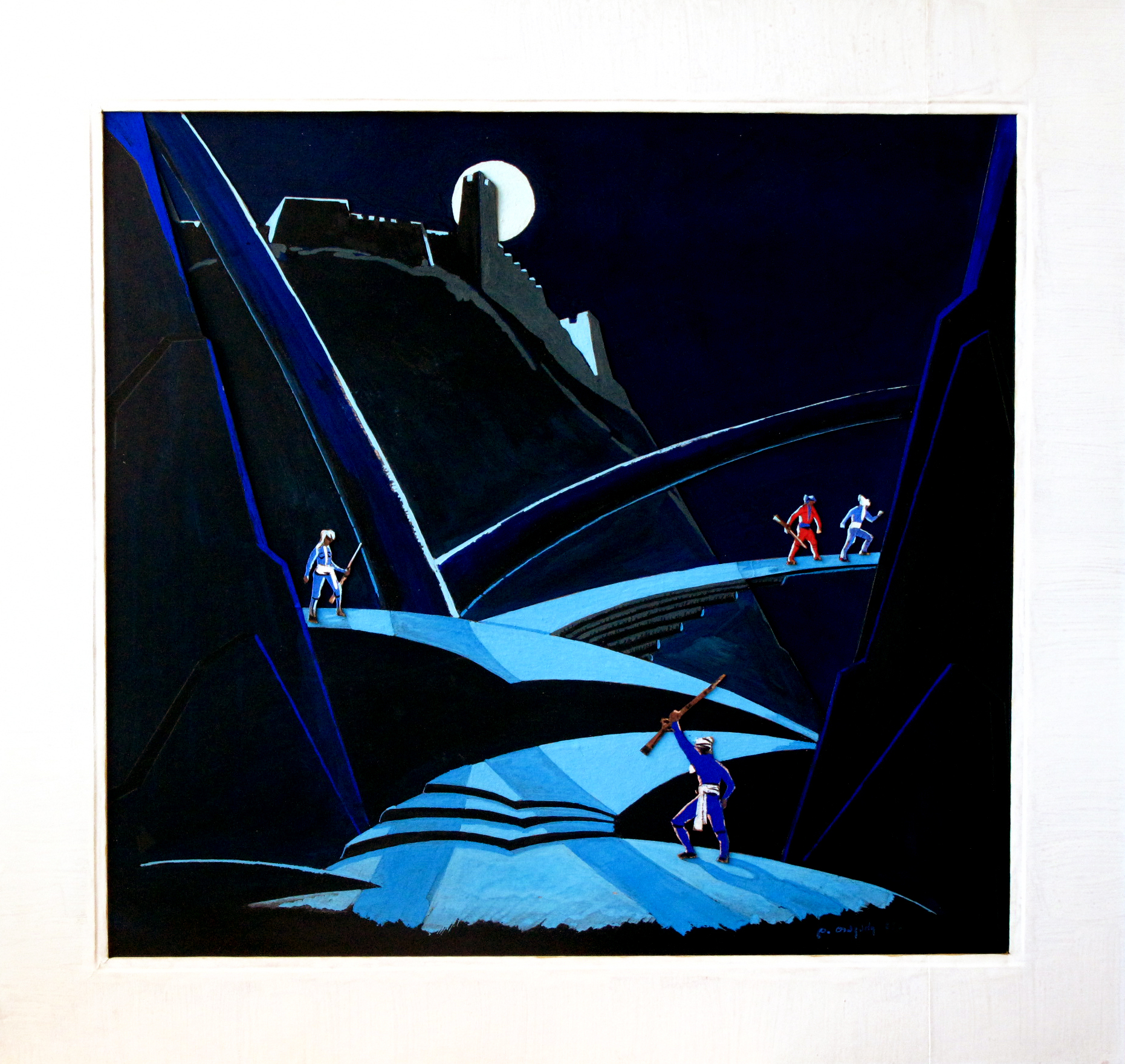
1963; Kutaisi Meskhishvili Theatre; Japaridze – "Bughara"

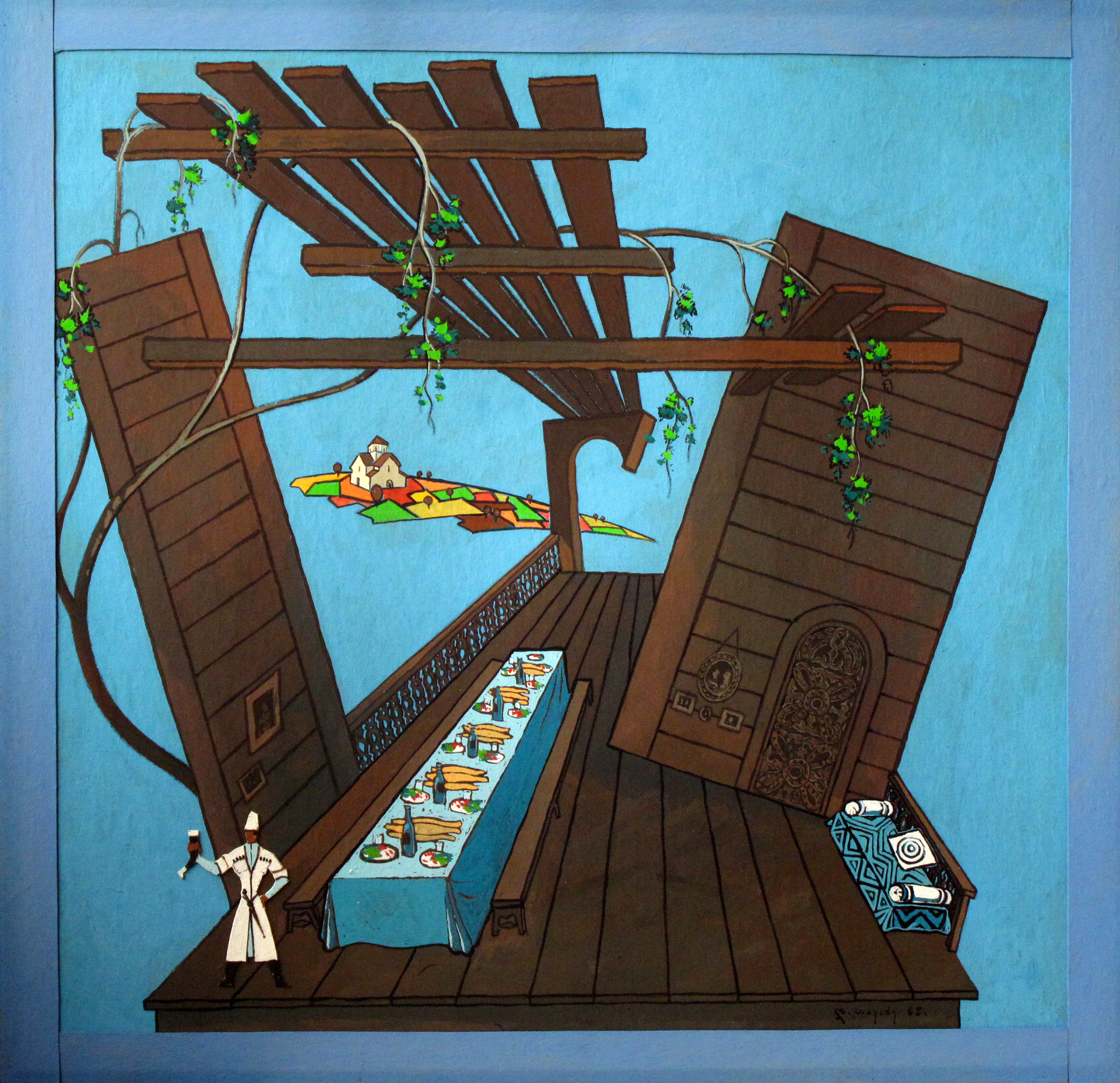
1965; Kutaisi Meskhishvili Theatre; Sh. Dadiani – "Yesterday's People"

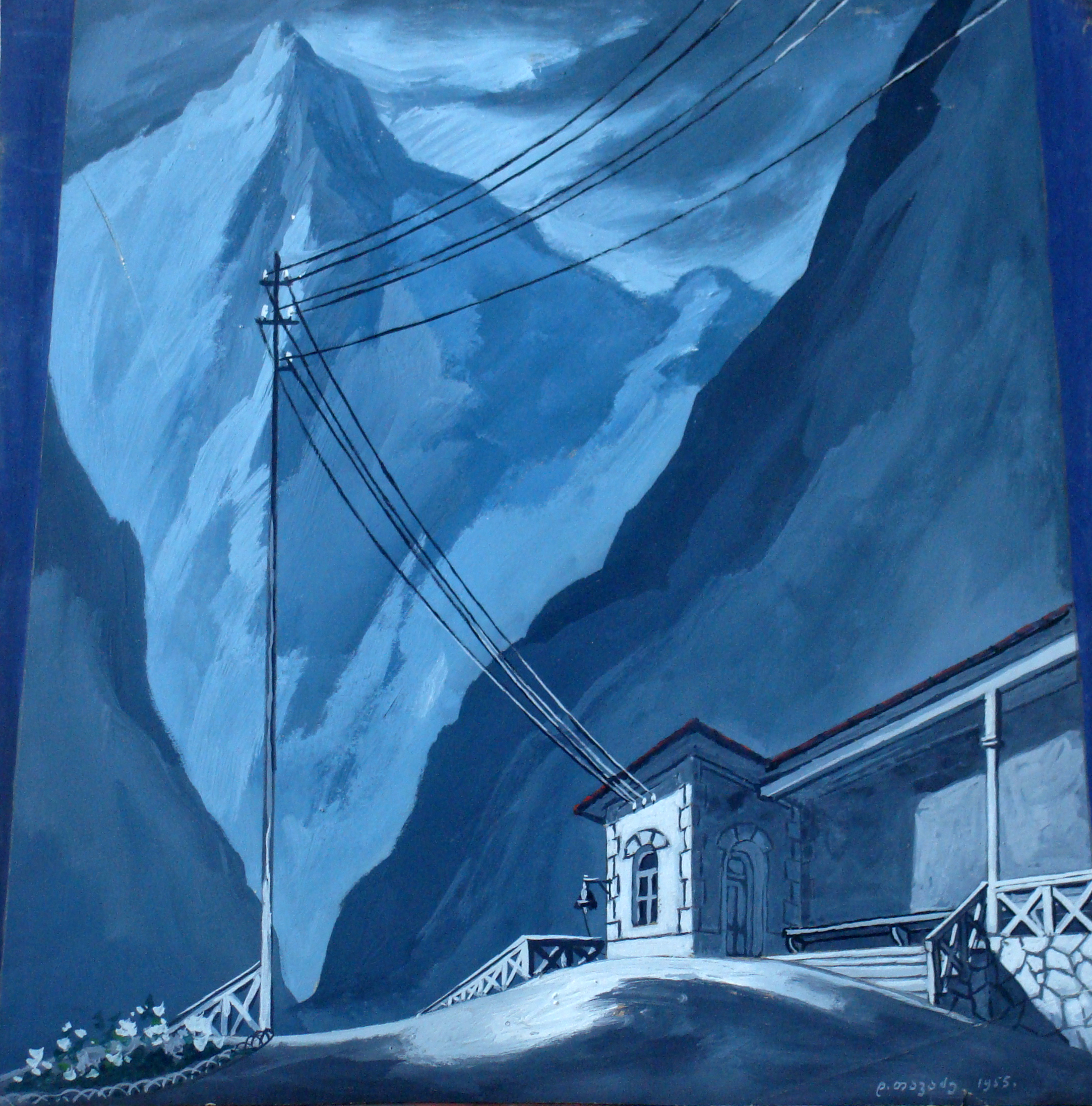
1955; Moscow Pushkin Theater; Kelbakiani – "The Young Teacher"

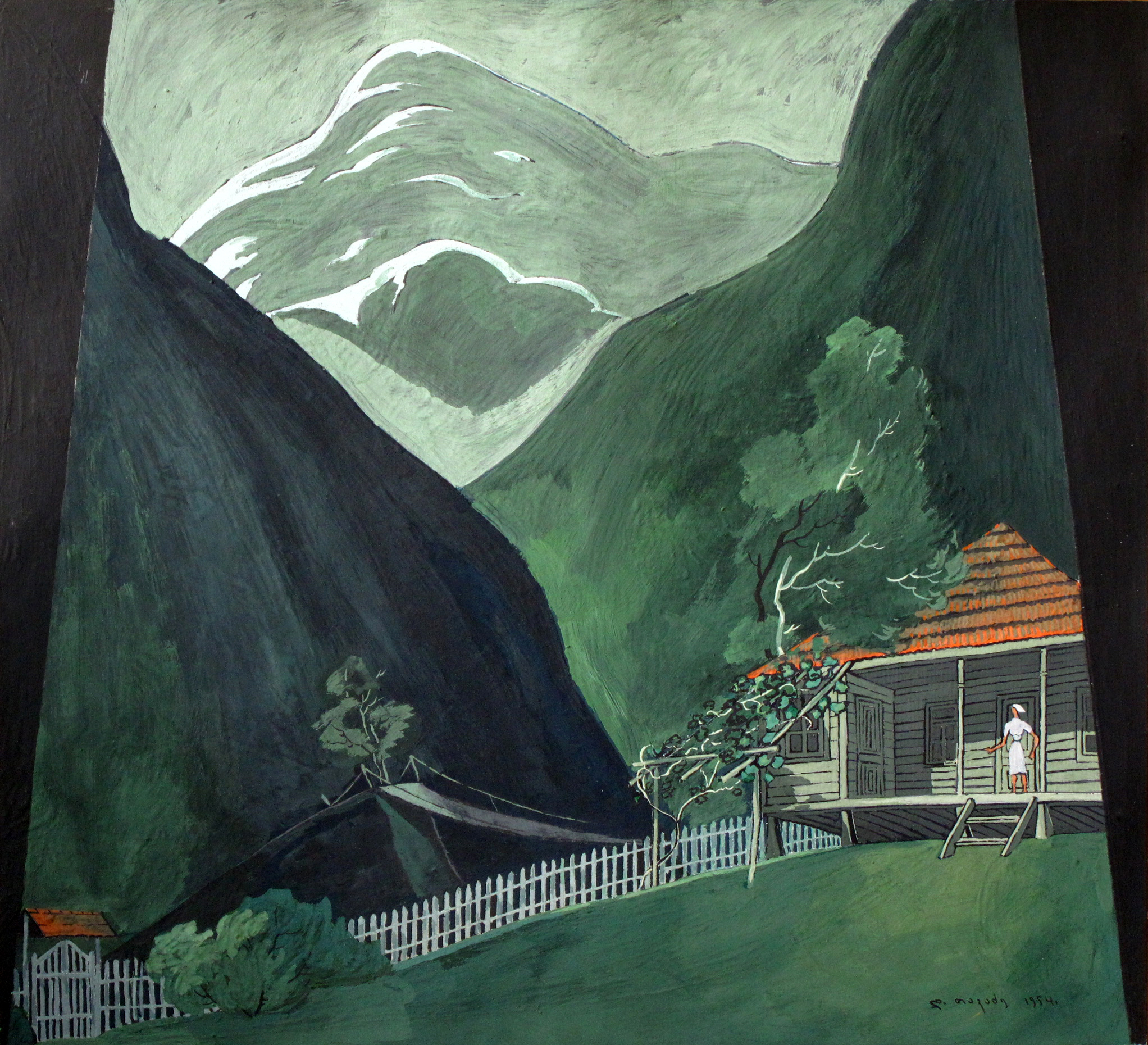
1954; Kiev Lesja Ukrainka Theater; M. Baratashvili – "Dragonfly"

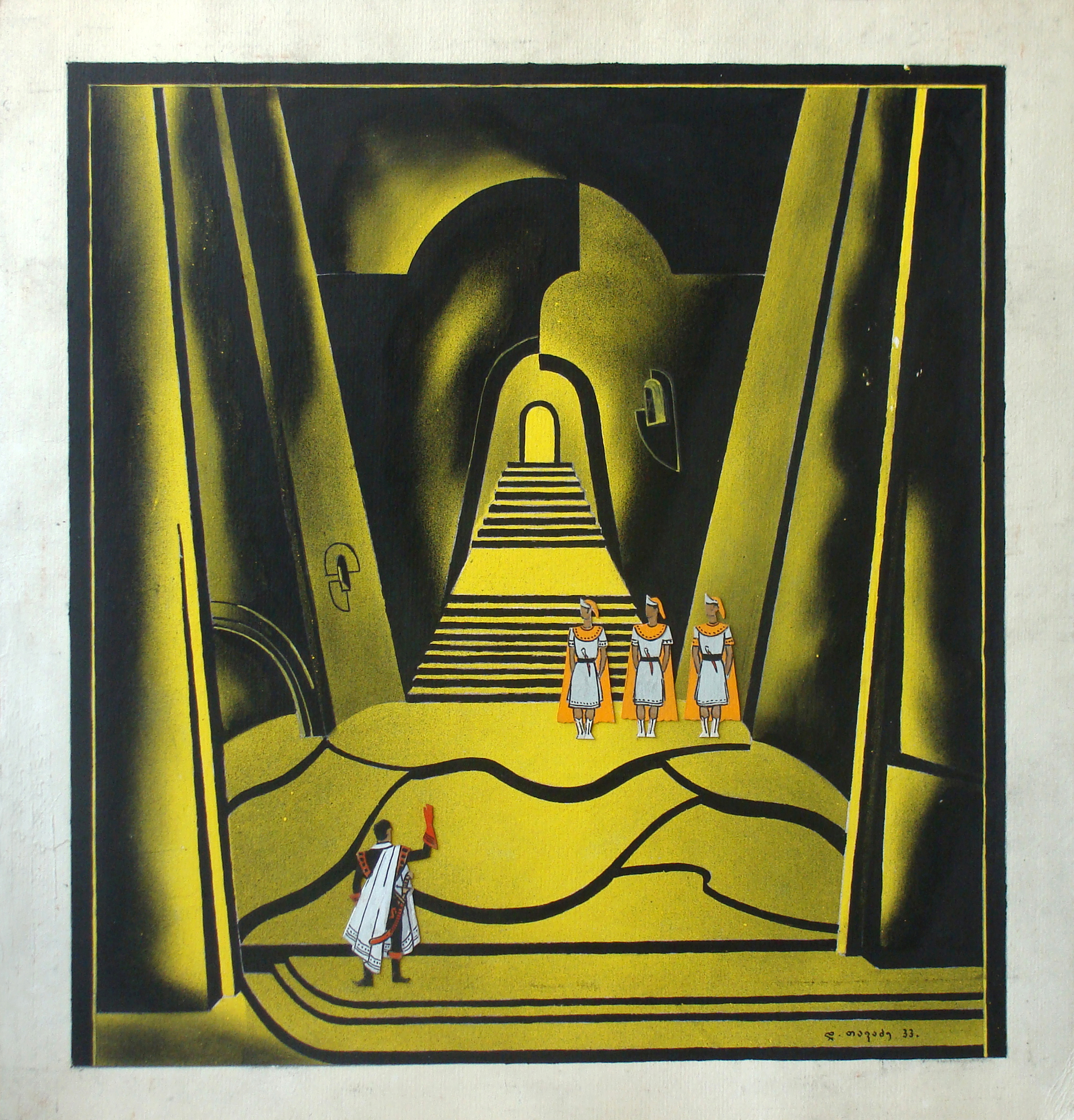
1933; Kirovabad Theater; Shakespeare – "Othello"

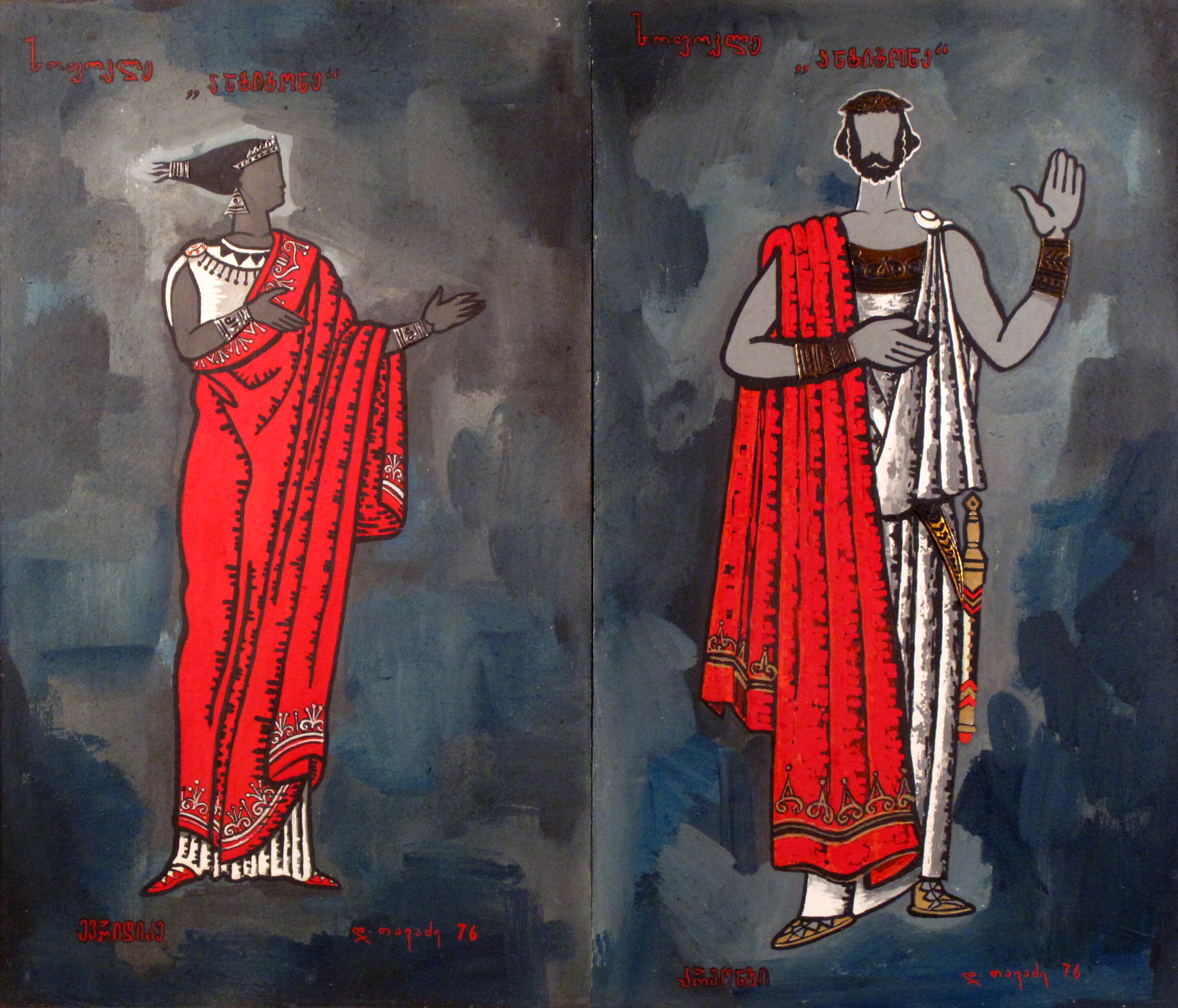
1976; Kirovabad Theater; Sophocles – "Antigone"

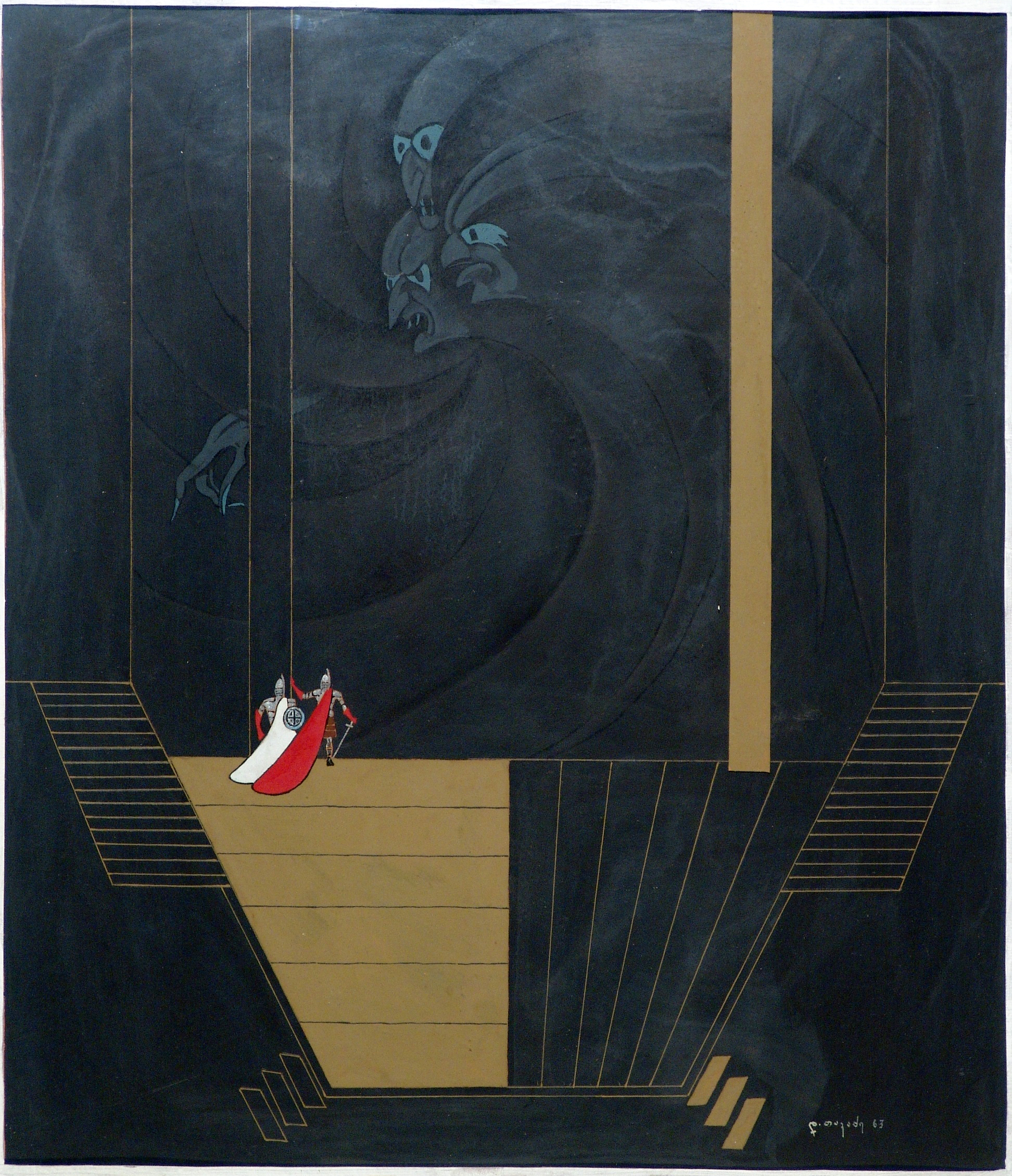
1963; Shakespeare – "Macbeth" (Project)

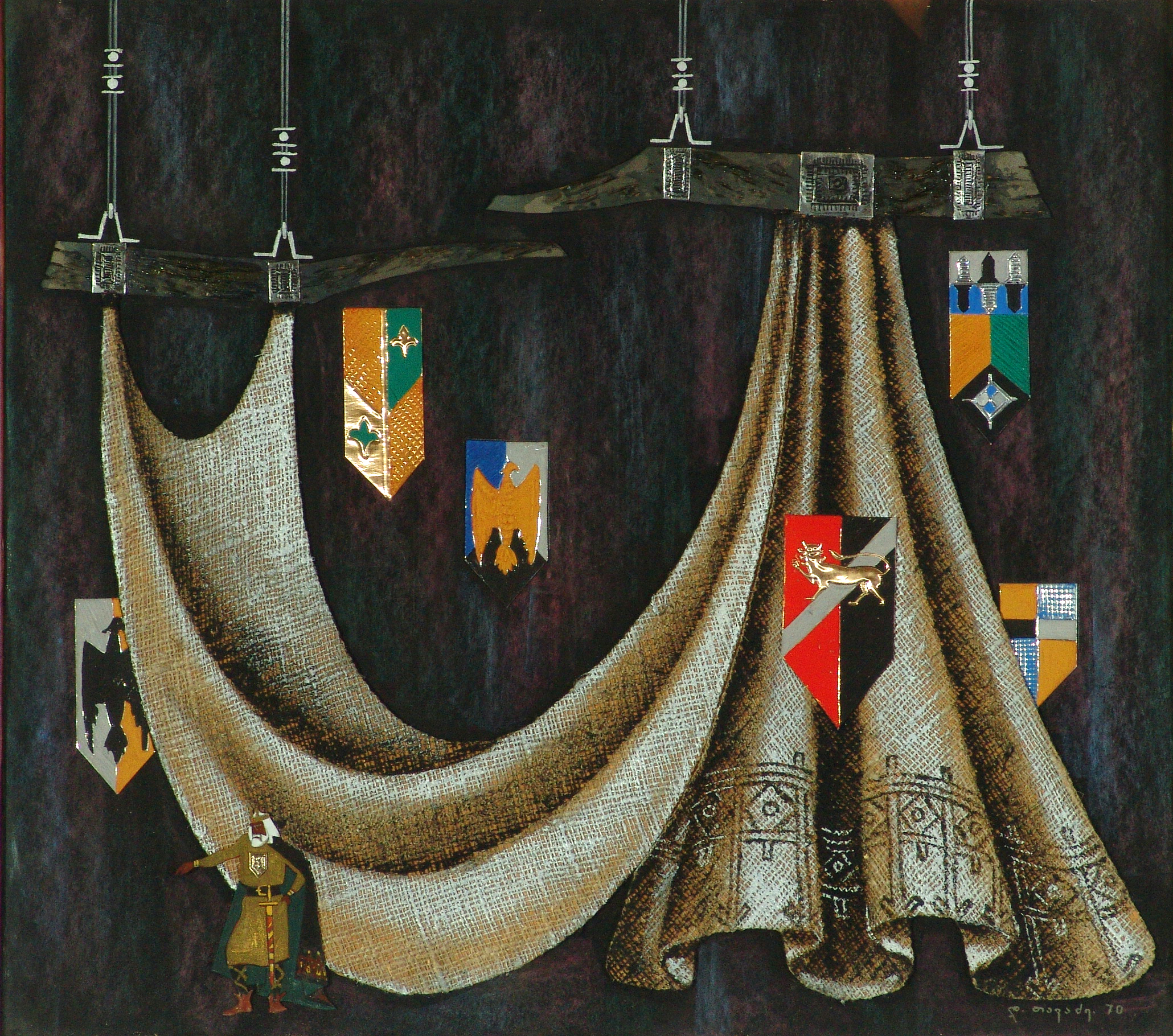
1970; Shakespeare – "King Lear" (Project)

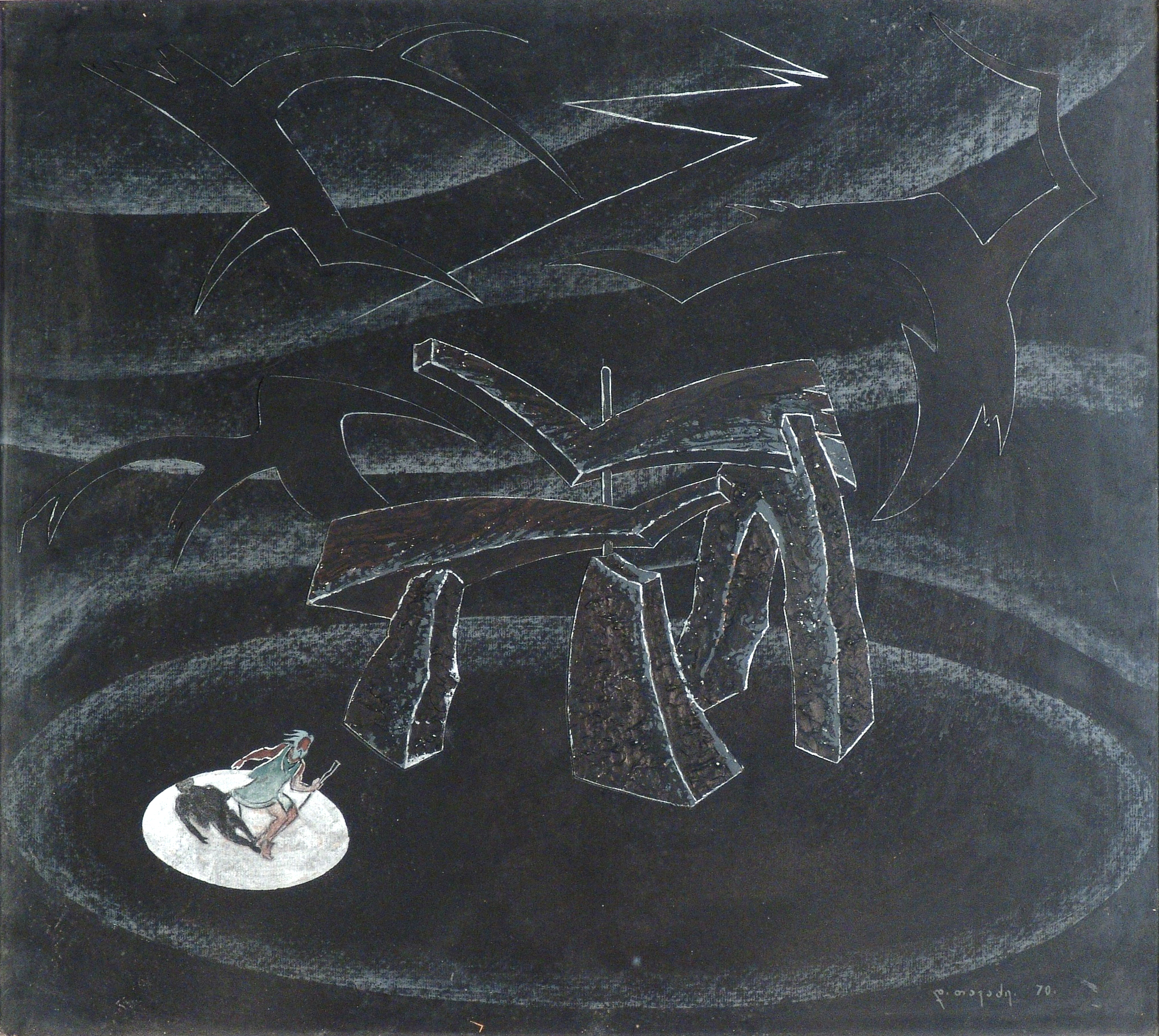
1970; Shakespeare – "King Lear" (Project)

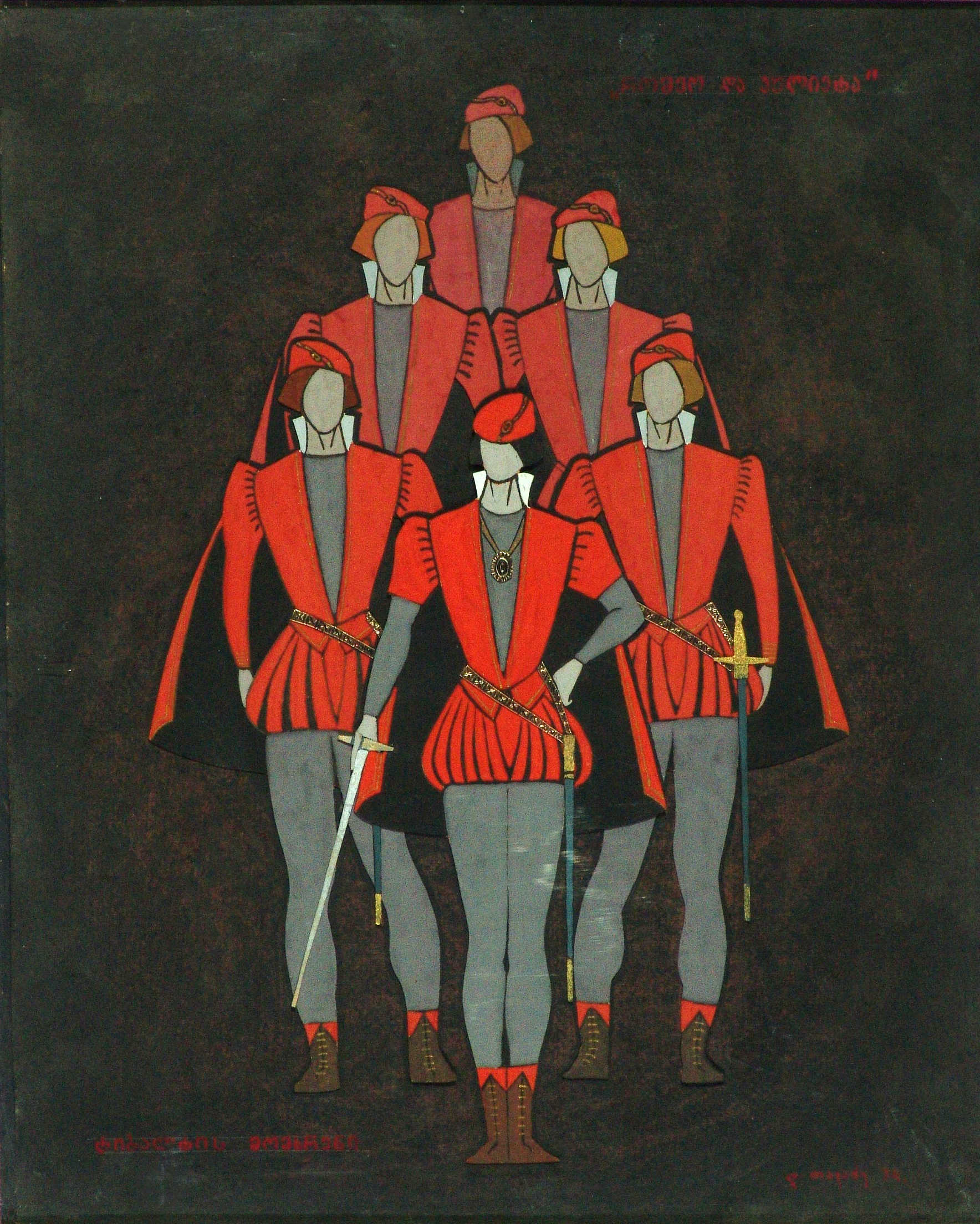
1974; Shakespeare – "Romeo and Juliet" (Project)

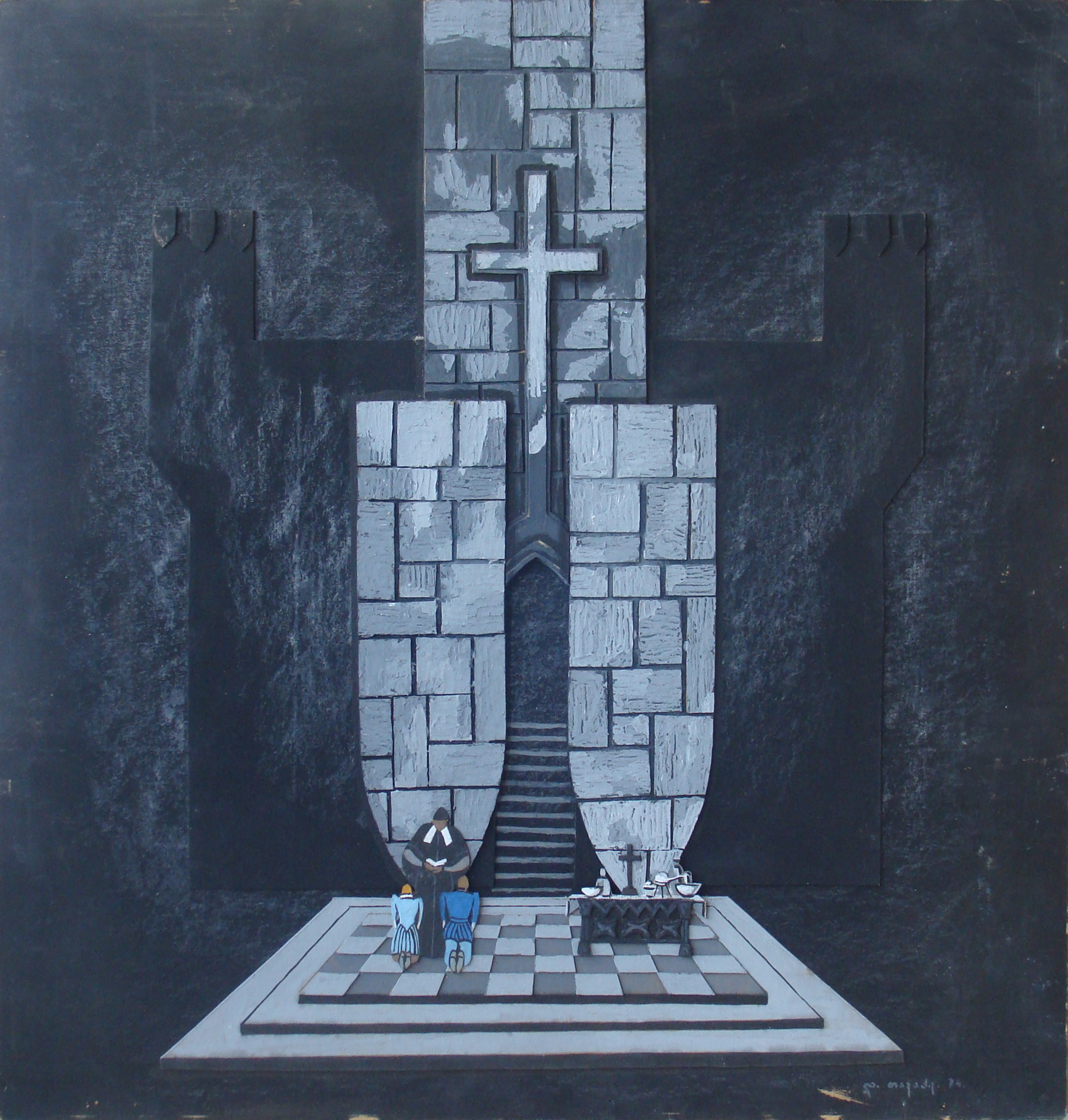
1974; Shakespeare – "Romeo and Juliet" (Project)

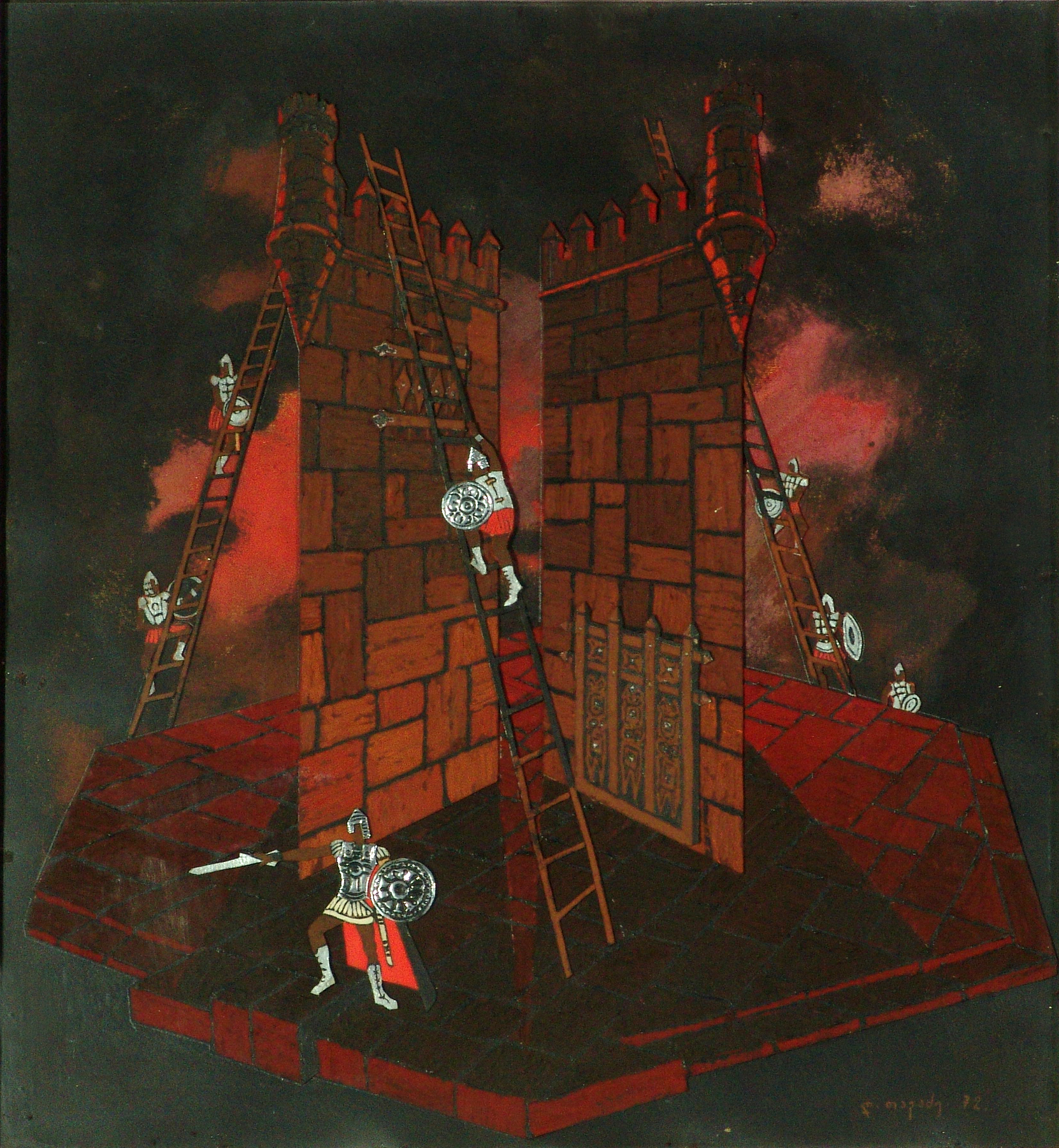
1974; Shakespeare – "Julius Caesar" (Project)

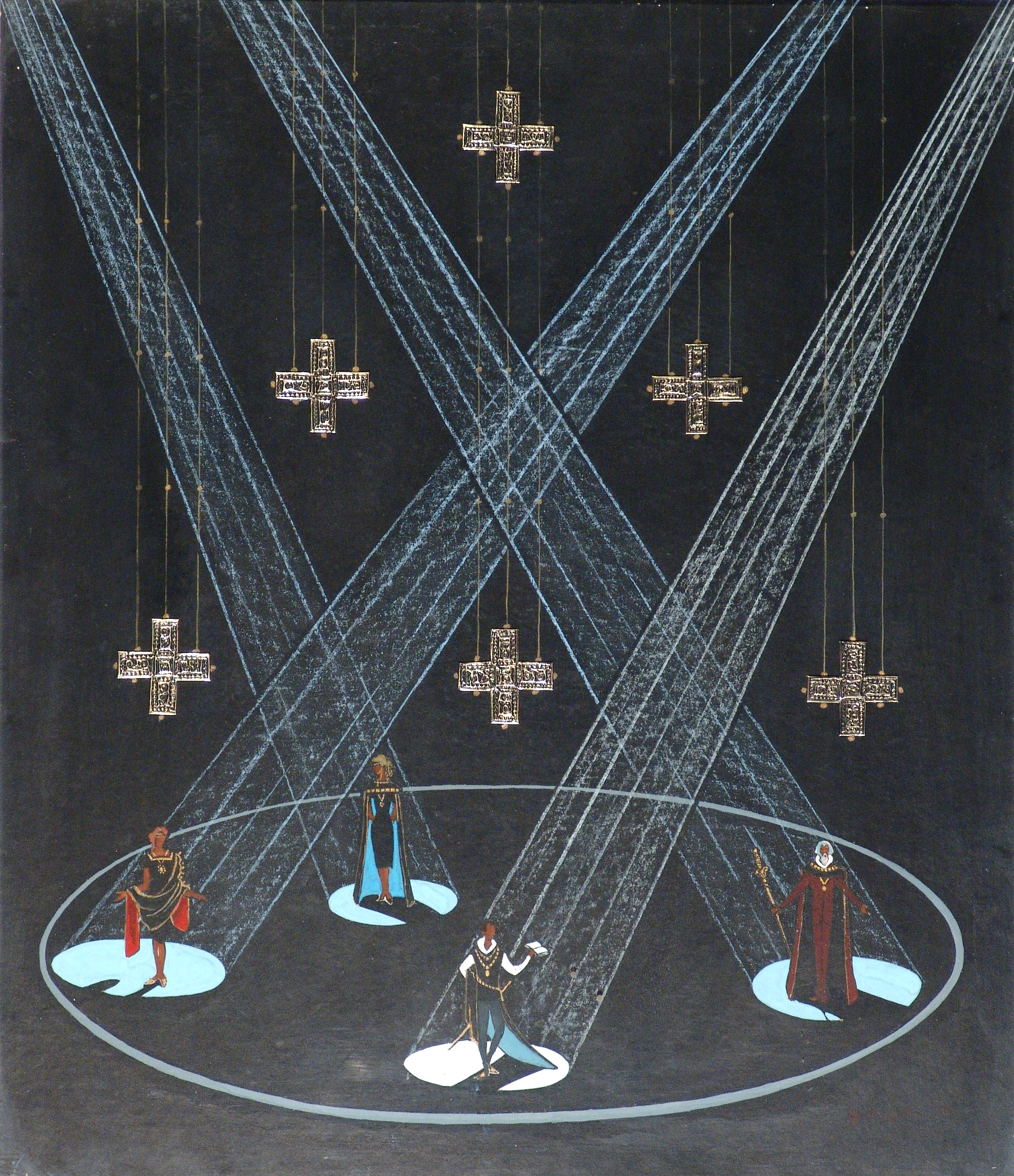
1974; Shakespeare – "Hamlet" (Project)
