= Catholic Church in Armenia =

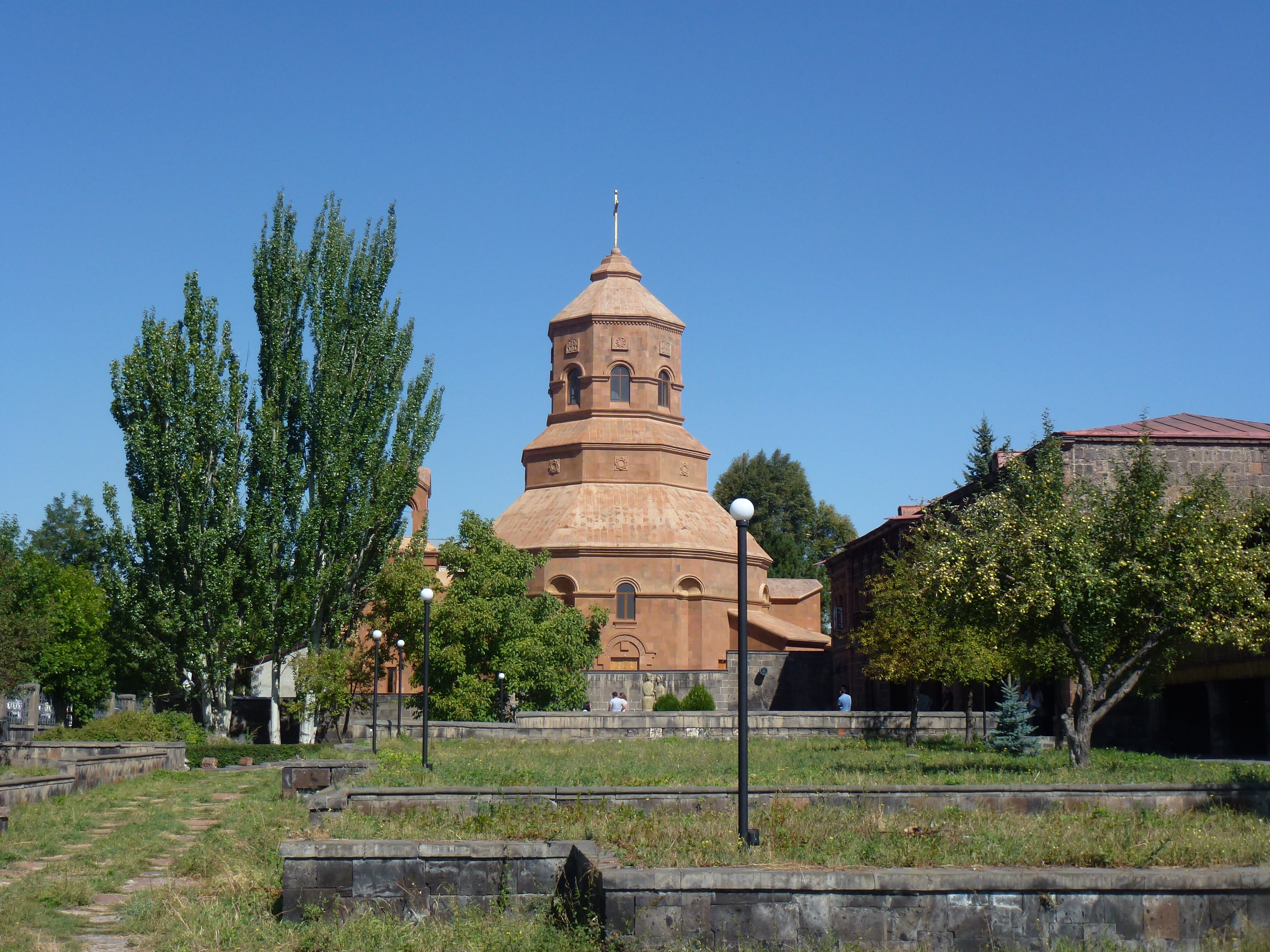
Cathedral of the Holy Martyrs, Gyumri

The 2011 census counted 13,843 Catholics in Armenia, representing about 0.46% of the total population. Catholics in Armenia belong to two particular churches, the Latin Church (which includes the vast majority of Catholics worldwide) and the Armenian Catholic Church.

== Territorial jurisdictions and dioceses ==
Catholics in Armenia are divided into two separate territorial jurisdictions. Latin Rite Catholics are part of an Apostolic Administration, the Apostolic Administration of the Caucasus, and Armenian Rite Catholics belonging to the Armenian Catholic Church are part of an ordinariate for the faithful of eastern rite, the Ordinariate for Catholics of Armenian Rite in Eastern Europe, which also includes Armenian Catholic Church members in Eastern Europe.

== Within Armenia ==
The Catholics have always lived somewhat separate from the communities of Armenian Apostolic Church (an Oriental Orthodox Church that includes most Armenians as members), and intermarriage is not very common. Some Armenian Apostolic Church members refer to the Armenian Catholics as "Franks," because of the influence of French Catholic missionaries.

The traditional home of Armenian Catholics is the Shirak Province, specifically 7 villages including: Arevik, Panik, Lanjik, Azatan, Dzithankov, Mets Sepasar, Ashotsk. In the Lori Province, Catholics live in 6 localities: Tashir, Katnarat, Katnaghbyur, Petrovka, Saratovka, Blagodarnoye.

In an interview, Aid to the Church in Need's project manager for Armenia, described the Catholic Community and the difficulties it faces. "In Armenia, the Catholic Church can be found almost exclusively in regions located in the northwestern parts of the country, in addition to a number of parishes behind the border in southwestern Georgia. These are poor and inhospitable regions situated at an altitude of more than 2,000 metres. The winters are harsh and can last up to six months. The unemployment rate is very high and the only option left for many of these people is seasonal or permanent migration to neighbouring countries."

The few Poles left in Armenia along with some new immigrants who are Catholics (Latin Rite) live in Yerevan.

== See also ==
- Apostolic Nunciature to Armenia
- Armenian Catholic Church
- Catholic Church by country
- Mechitarists
- San Lazzaro degli Armeni
