= Armenian Caritas =

Humanitarian organisation of the Catholic Church in Armenia

- Հայկական Կարիտաս
- Established: May 1995; 30 years ago
- Type: Nonprofit ("Benevolent NGO")
- Legal status: Benevolent NGO
- Purpose: social services, humanitarian relief, advocacy
- Location: Gyumri, Armenia
- Coordinates: 40.79059°N 43.83417°E
- Region served: Armenia
- Official language: Armenian, English
- Secretary General: Gagik Tarasyan
- President: Raphaël Bedros XXI Minassian
- Affiliations: Caritas Europa, Caritas Internationalis
- Revenue: €5,259,139 (2023)
- Website: caritas.am

Armenian Caritas (Armenian: Հայկական Կարիտաս) is a not-for-profit social welfare and humanitarian relief organisation based in Armenia. It is a service of the Armenian Catholic Church and a member of both Caritas Europa and Caritas Internationalis.

== History ==
In 1993, Catholic Relief Services (CRS), the American branch of the Caritas Internationalis confederation, recruited Zevart Nadjarian to help establish a Caritas office in Armenia. In October 1994, Nadjarian and Robert Quinlan from CRS's Geneva office visited the Ordinariate for Catholics of Armenian Rite in Eastern Europe, based in Gyumri. Their goal was to assess the willingness of the Armenian Catholic Church to set up a Caritas office, engage in relief and development activities, accept technical assistance from CRS, and use future resources to help vulnerable persons in need, ensuring that assistance was based on need rather than on religious affiliation.

The Armenian Catholic Ordinariate in Gyumri, headed by Archbishop Nerses Der Nersessian and Vicar General Nechan Karakéhéyan agreed to the plan. In May 1995, the Armenian Catholic Church established a Caritas office in Gyumri. The organisation was quickly accepted as an associated member of Caritas Internationalis for Armenia. The following year, a board of directors was established and started working on an organisational strategy. In 1997, the Armenian Ministry of Justice recognised Caritas Armenia as a local NGO. Two years later, Armenian Caritas was accepted as a full member of Caritas Internationalis. Archbishop Der Nersessian retired in 2004 and was replaced as president by Bishop Nechan Karakéhéyan.

The first projects of Armenian Caritas focused on relief activities, providing basic assistance to their beneficiaries. In January 1998, Armenian Caritas began implementing community-based development programmes, such as water and sanitation projects. Towards the end of the 1990s, Armenian Caritas also benefited from capacity strengthening activities provided by CRS and the Dutch Caritas organisation, Cordaid. Since then, Armenian Caritas has progressively expanded in size and scope.

In 2019, the Armenian government planned to give Armenian Caritas land in Shahumyan and Taperakan for a "City of Children" for 600 disabled and disadvantaged children and youth. Protests from other civil society organisations, citing concerns of isolation for people with disabilities, led to a review, but the project was never implemented.

As of 2024, Armenian Caritas is active in the provinces of Ararat, Gegharkunik, Lori, Shirak, Syunik, and Yerevan.

== Work ==
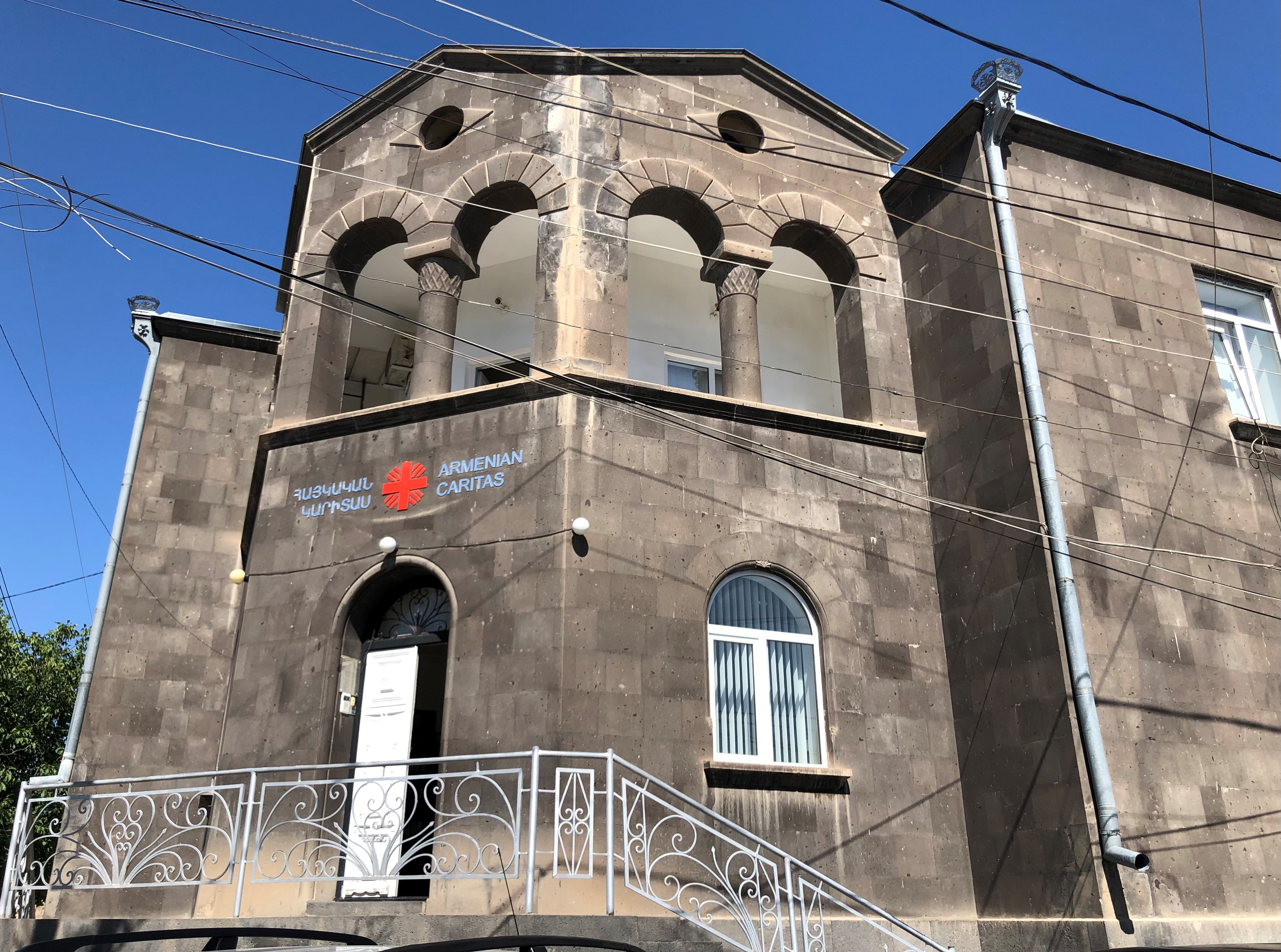
The headquarters of Armenian Caritas in Gyumri.

Armenian Caritas is active in several areas of social protection and care. It runs four daycare centres named "Little Prince Centres" for children from disadvantaged families, located in Gyumri, Vanadzor, Artashat, and Gavar, with the goal of integrating disadvantaged children and youth through social and psychological support. In Gyumri, Armenian Caritas also operates the Emili Aregak Center, a daycare and therapy centre for children and youth with disabilities. A bakery was also founded as a spin-off social enterprise in the same city. The Emili Aregak Center is co-financed by the Ministry of Labour and Social Affairs and was co-founded by Armenian Caritas and Caritas Austria. Additionally, Armenian Caritas provides social services for elderly people living alone.

In the field of migration, Armenian Caritas implements projects aimed at improving the socio-economic conditions of returnees and displaced individuals. Additionally, it engages in advocacy to protect the interests and rights of migrants and displaced persons and works to prevent human trafficking.

Another objective is community development, particularly in poorer, rural areas. Armenian Caritas undertakes initiatives to promote inclusive and sustainable local economic growth. These initiatives include fostering entrepreneurship, promoting and supporting sustainable agriculture, strengthening the vocational education and training (VET) sector, and increasing access to renewable energies.

Since its inception, a key area of focus for Armenian Caritas has been the delivery of humanitarian aid for both natural disasters, such as floods, and man-made disasters, such as the influx of refugees during the Second Nagorno-Karabakh War in 2020. In their relief programmes, staff distribute essential items including food, clothing, medication, and blankets, and provide shelter and accommodation. Armenian Caritas also assisted communities during the height of the COVID-19 pandemic.

The work of Armenian Caritas is funded by an array of public and private partners, including different Armenian ministries, United Nations agencies, members of the Caritas Internationalis confederation, including Caritas Germany, Caritas Austria, Caritas France, and CRS, as well as of other international NGOs and charitable organisations. The organisation implements its work both using staff and volunteers.
