= Shirak Plain =

Geographical feature in Armenia

Coordinates: 40.63°N 43.90°E

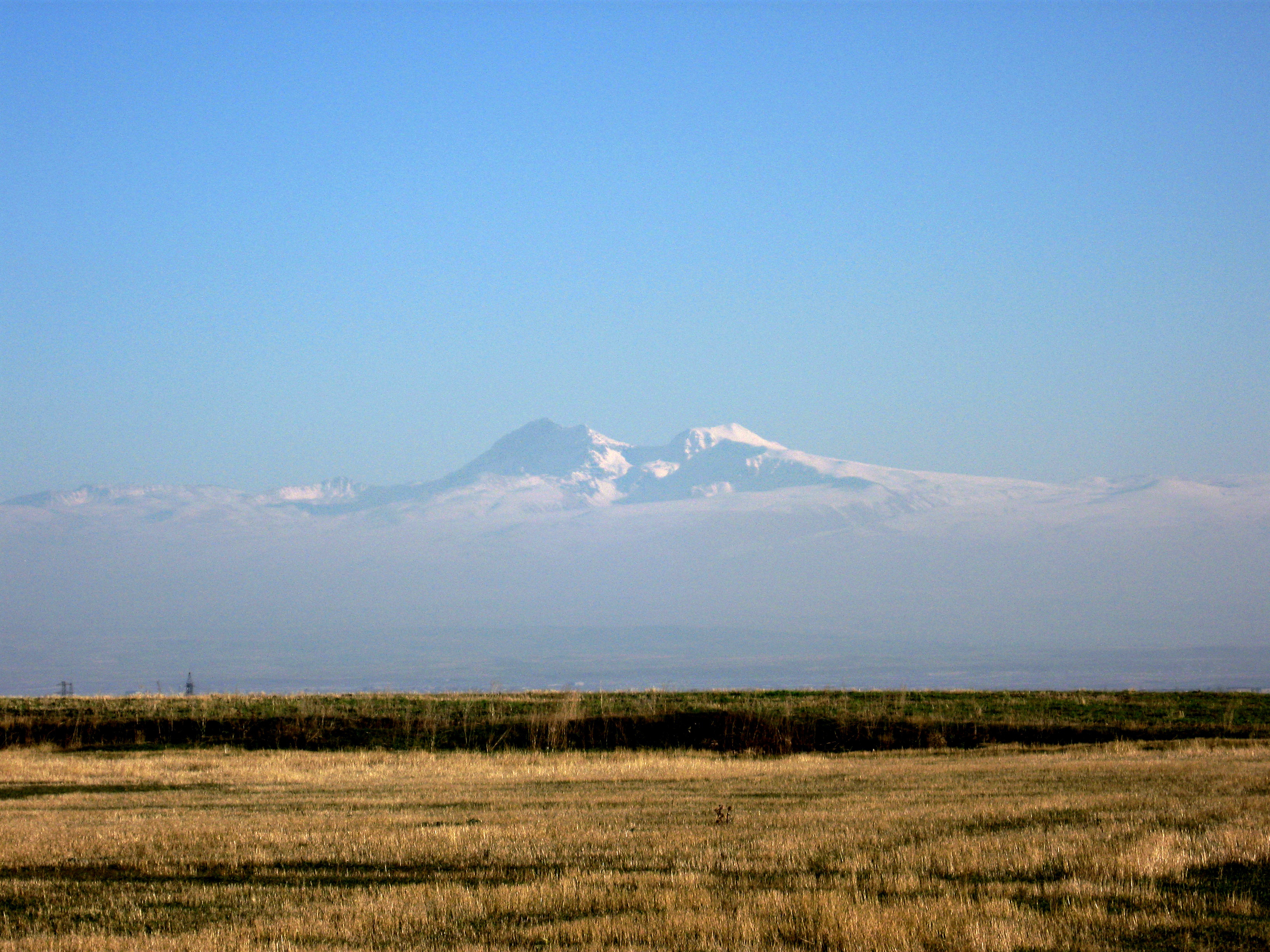
Shirak Plain with Mount Aragats in the background (from north to south)

Shirak Plain (Armenian: Շիրակի դաշտ Shiraki dašt) is a large plain located in the Armenian plateau, in northwest Armenia. It roughly occupies almost the entire area of Shirak Province, the southwestern parts of Lori Province, as well as the northern parts of Aragatsotn Province. The northern part of the province is the Ashotsk Plateau.

== Geography ==
The Shirak Plain stretches from the left bank of the Akhuryan River in the west to the Pambak Mountains in the east. The plain is dominated by the Shirak Mountains to the north, while the volcanoes of Shara and Aragats form the southern and southeastern borders of the plain. The Akhuryan River separates the Shirak Plain from the Kars volcanic plateau to the west, which is located on the right bank of the river in modern-day Turkey.

The elevation of the plain ranges between 1,400 and 1,900 meters above sea level.

== Urban settlements ==
Gyumri, Artik, Maralik and Talin are the main urban settlements within the Shirak Plain.

== Gallery ==
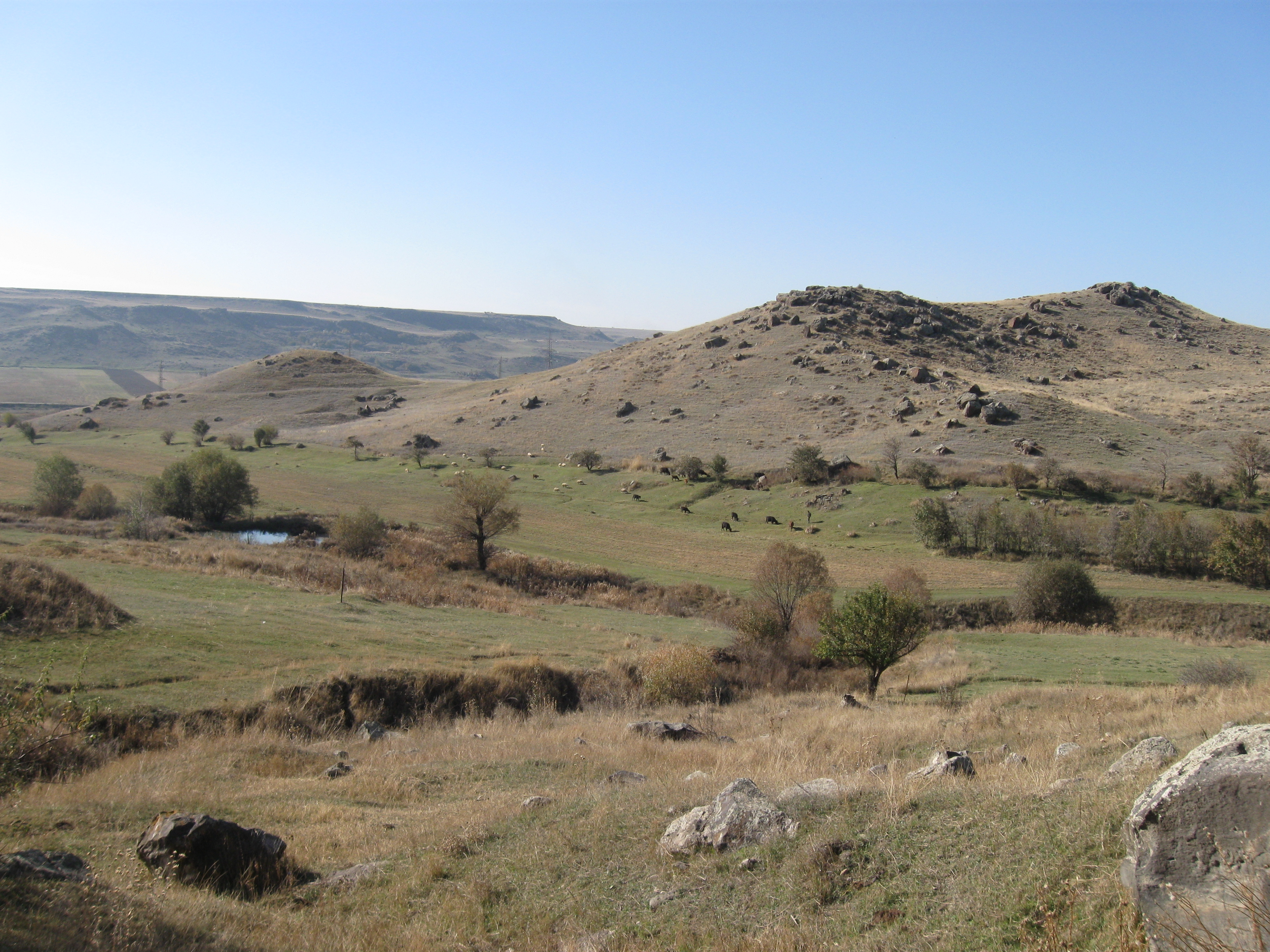
Shirak plain at Marmashen

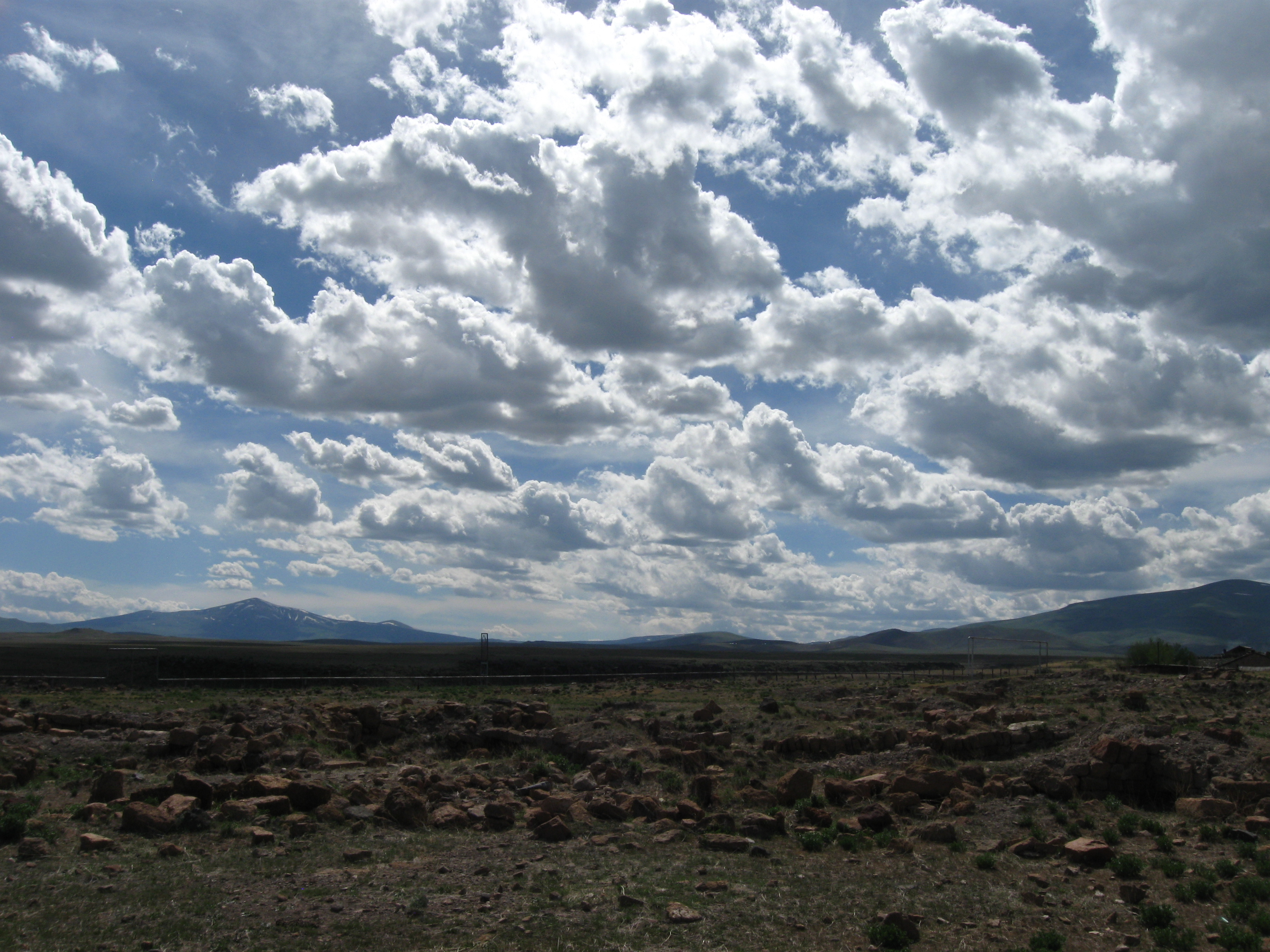
Steppes at the Shirak plateau around Anipemza

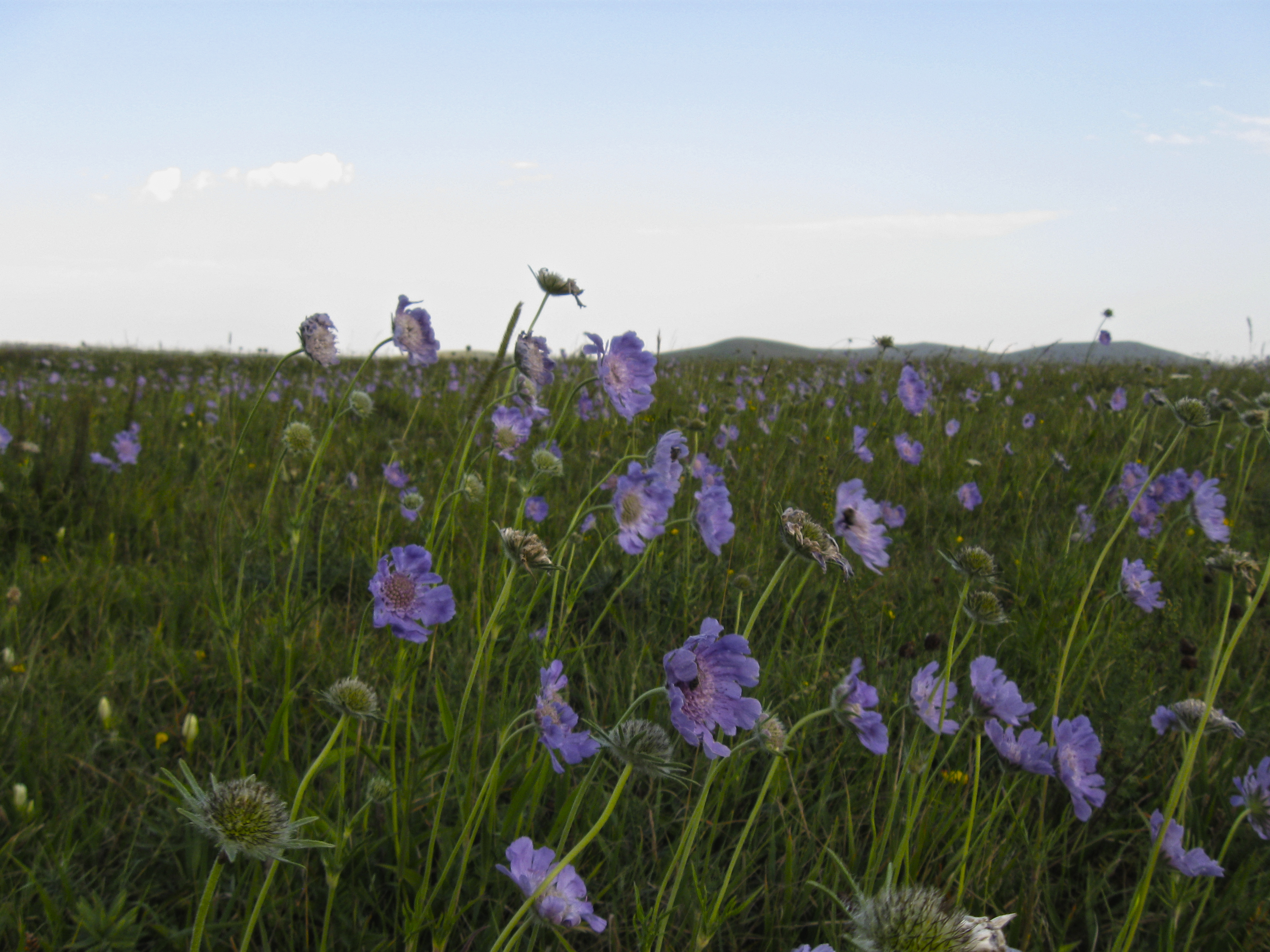
Steppes at the Shirak plateau northwest of Amasia

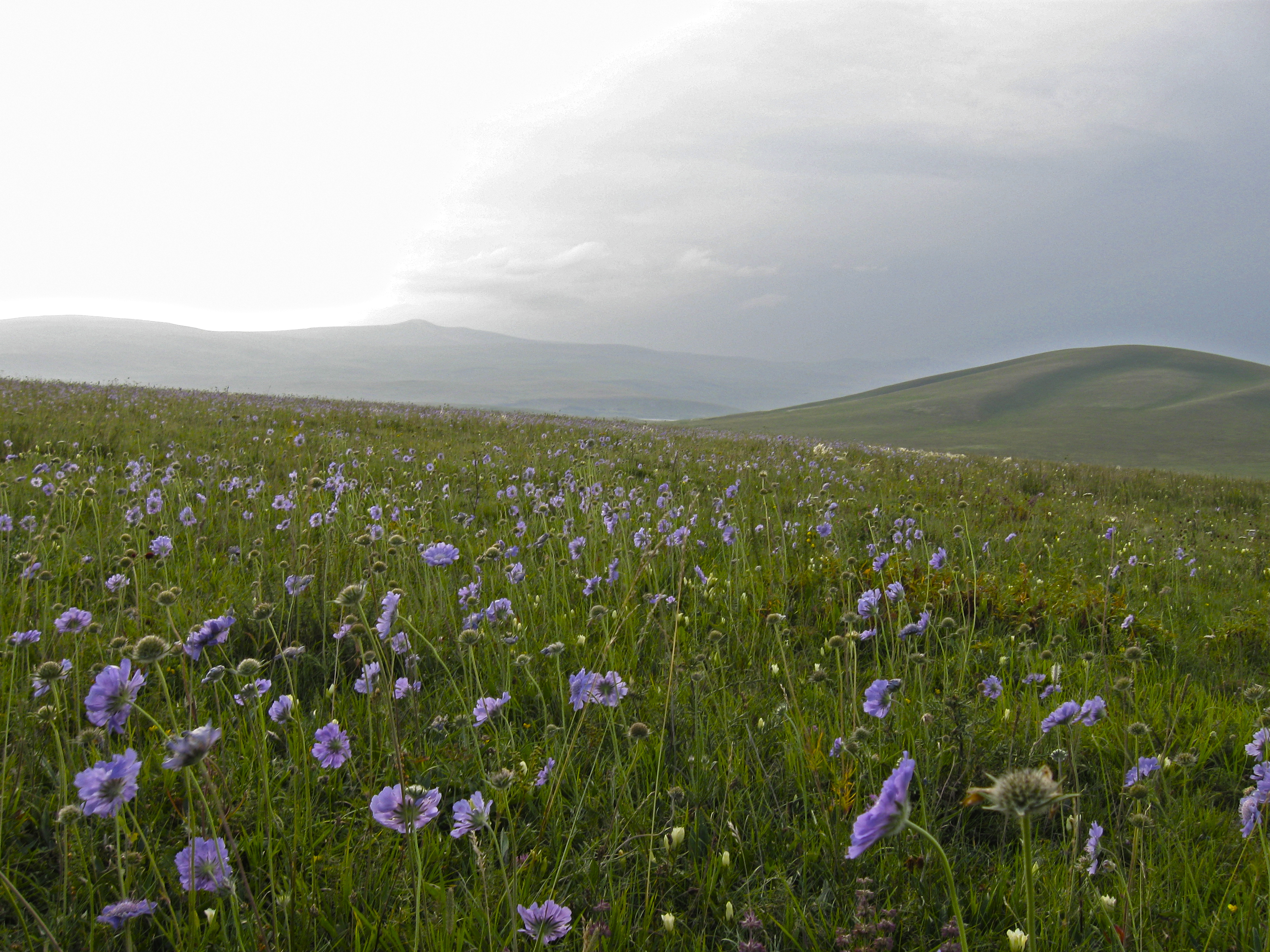
Steppes at the Shirak plateau northwest of Amasia

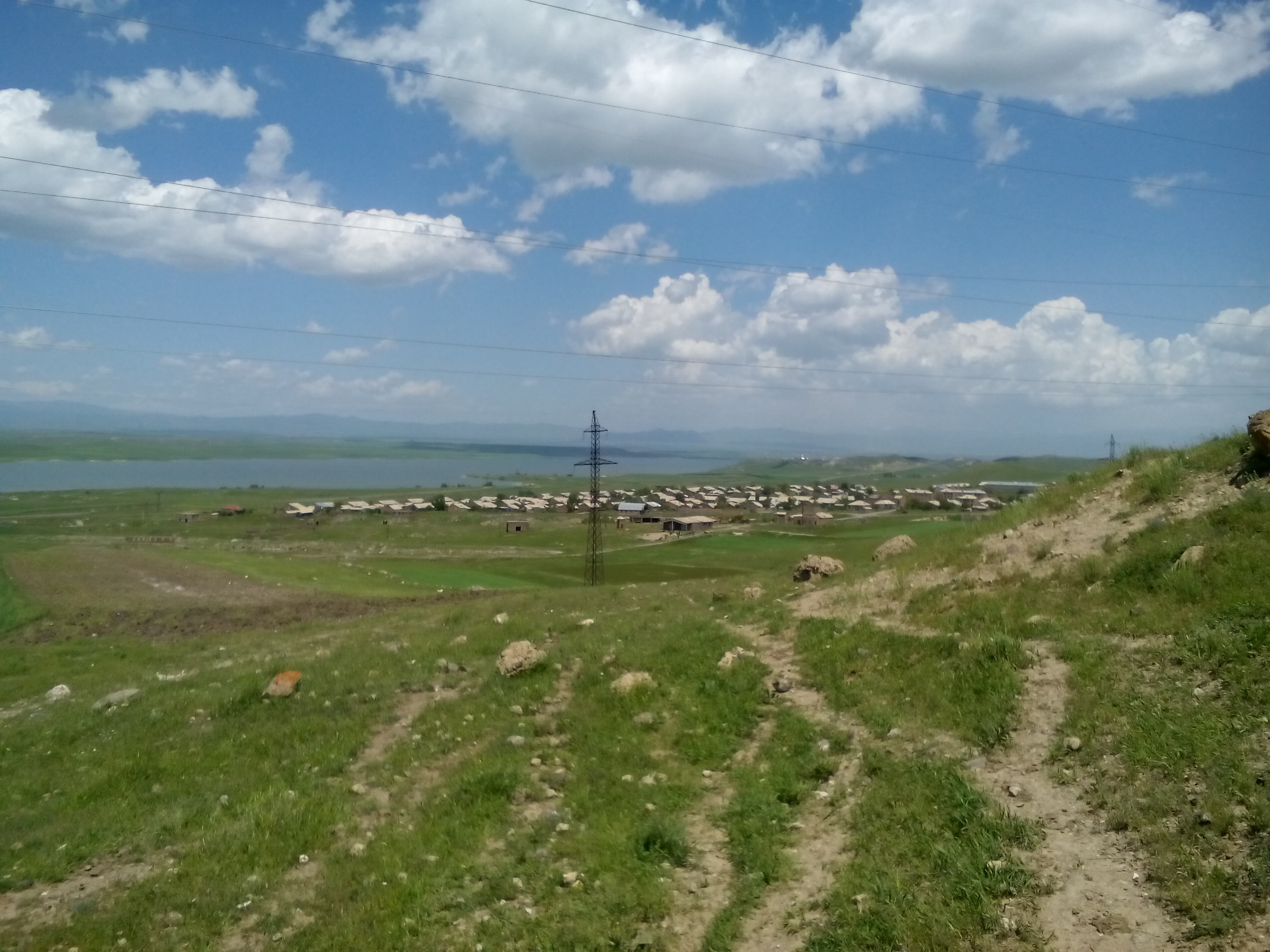
Shirak Plain near Isahakyan

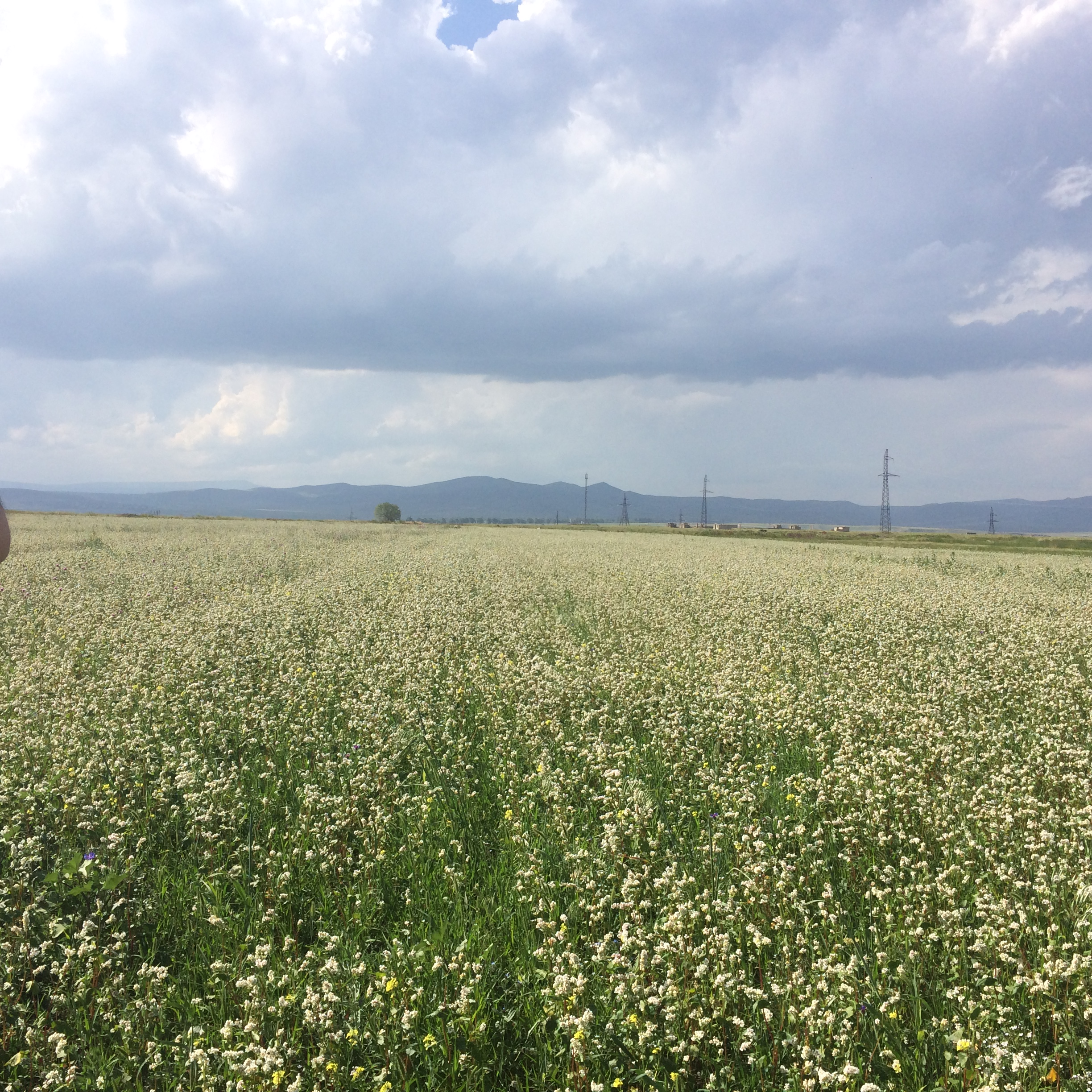
Buckwheat fields in Shirak

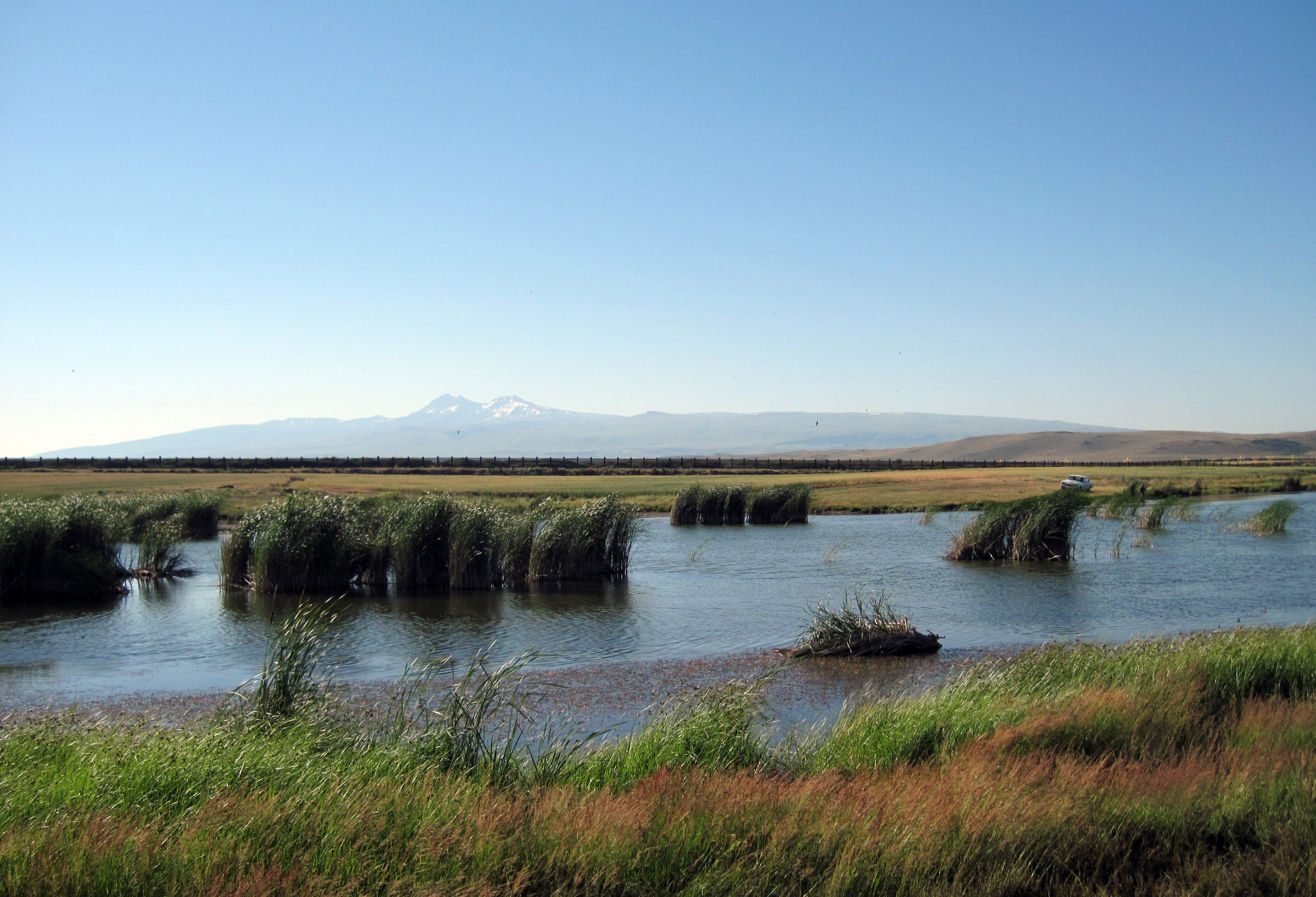
Lake Azatan near the Azatan village, Shirak Plain
