= Karakhs =

Karakhs may refer to:

- Azatan, Armenia
- Vanadzor, Armenia
