= Kechichian =

Kechichian is a surname. Notable people with the surname include:

- Joseph A. Kéchichian (born March 15, 1954), Lebanese-born American political scientist
- Liliam Kechichián (born 1952), Uruguayan politician
- Robert Kechichian (born 1946), French-Armenian film director, actor, and screenwriter
- Vartan Kechichian (1933–2017), Syrian-born Armenian Catholic hierarch
