= Cathedral of the Holy Martyrs, Gyumri =

Armenian Catholic cathedral in Gyumri, Armenian

Cathedral of the Holy Martyrs
- Սրբոց Նահատակաց եկեղեցի
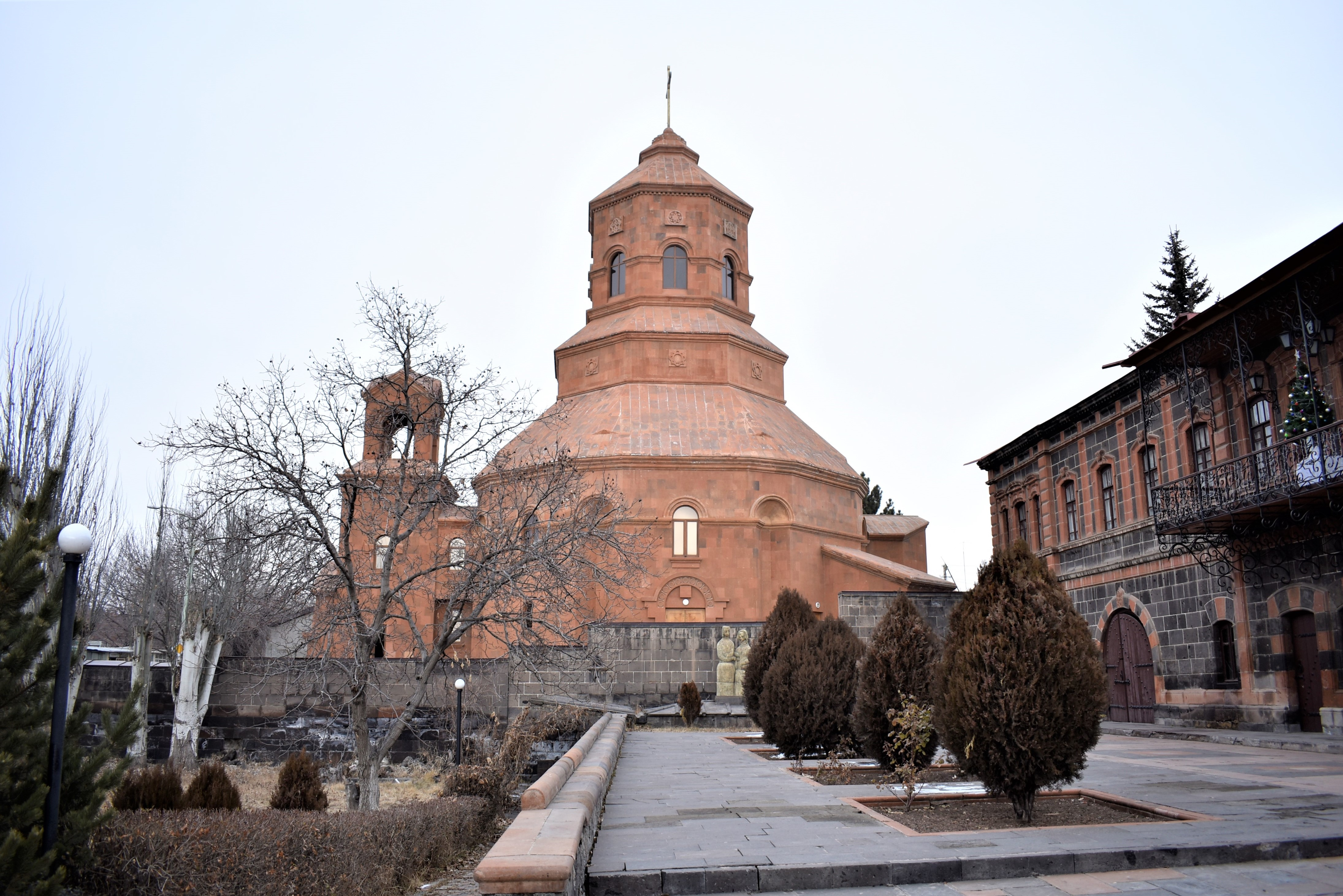
- The cathedral in 2020

- Location of the cathedral in Armenia
- Cathedral of the Holy Martyrs
- 40°46′54″N 43°50′43″E
- Location: Victory (Haghtanak) Avenue, Gyumri, Shirak Province
- Country: Armenia
- Denomination: Catholic Church
- Sui iuris church: Rome
- Churchmanship: Armenian Catholic Church

History
- Status: Cathedral
- Dedication: Martyrs of the Armenian genocide
- Consecrated: 24 September 2015

Architecture
- Functional status: Active
- Architect: Hakob Jivanyan
- Architectural type: Armenian church
- Style: Circular style
- Groundbreaking: 8 December 2010
- Completed: 2015; 11 years ago

Administration
- Diocese: Ordinariate for Armenia, Georgia, Russia, and Eastern Europe

The Cathedral of the Holy Martyrs (Armenian: Սրբոց Նահատակաց եկեղեցի), in Gyumri, Armenia, is the cathedral of the Ordinariate for Armenia, Georgia, Russia, and Eastern Europe of the Armenian Catholic Church. It is located on the Victory (Haghtanak) Avenue, next to the Dzitoghtsyan Museum of National Architecture. Construction began in December 2010 and was completed in 2015.

The cathedral was originally to be named "Holy Cross", but changed to "Holy Martyrs" in honour of the canonized martyrs of the Armenian genocide.

== Architecture ==
The church of the Holy Martyrs is a pastiche of forms derived from medieval Armenian architecture, in particular Zvartnots. It has a belfry at its entrance. The architect is Hakob Jivanyan, while the construction engineer is Hakob Baghdasaryan. The decorative sculptures are composed by Razmik Ayvazyan.

== Consecration ==
On 24 September 2015, the cathedral was consecrated by Krikor Bedros XX Gabroyan, Catholicos-Patriarch of the Armenian Catholic Church, and Leonardo Sandri, Prefect of the Congregation for the Oriental Churches. The ceremony was held as part of the commemoration of the centennial of the Armenian genocide. The cathedral is named "Holy Martyrs" in memory of victims of the Armenian genocide (in 2015 the Armenian Apostolic Church canonized them as martyrs).

== Papal visit ==
On 25 June 2016, Pope Francis, accompanied by Catholicos Karekin II, visited the cathedral.

== Gallery ==
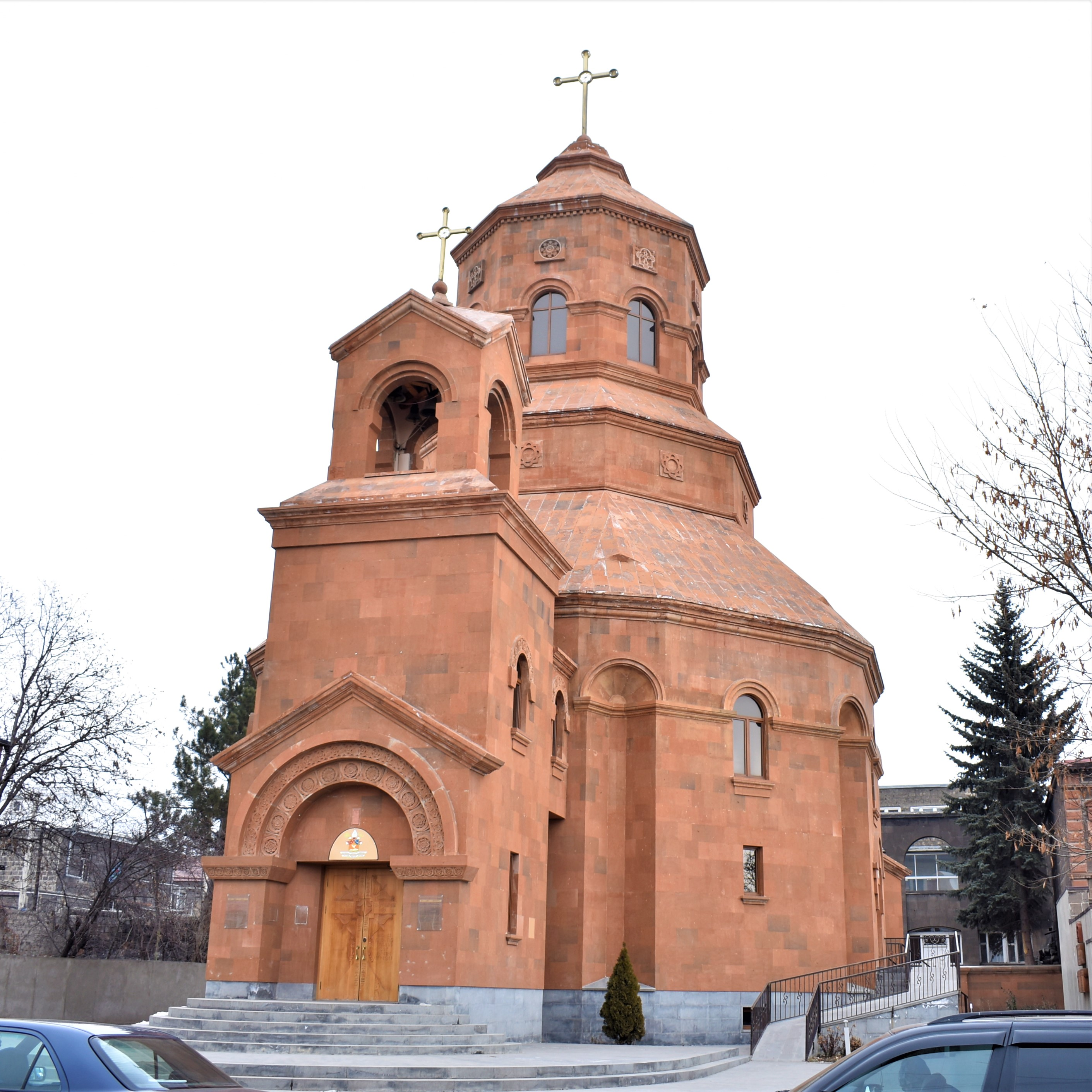

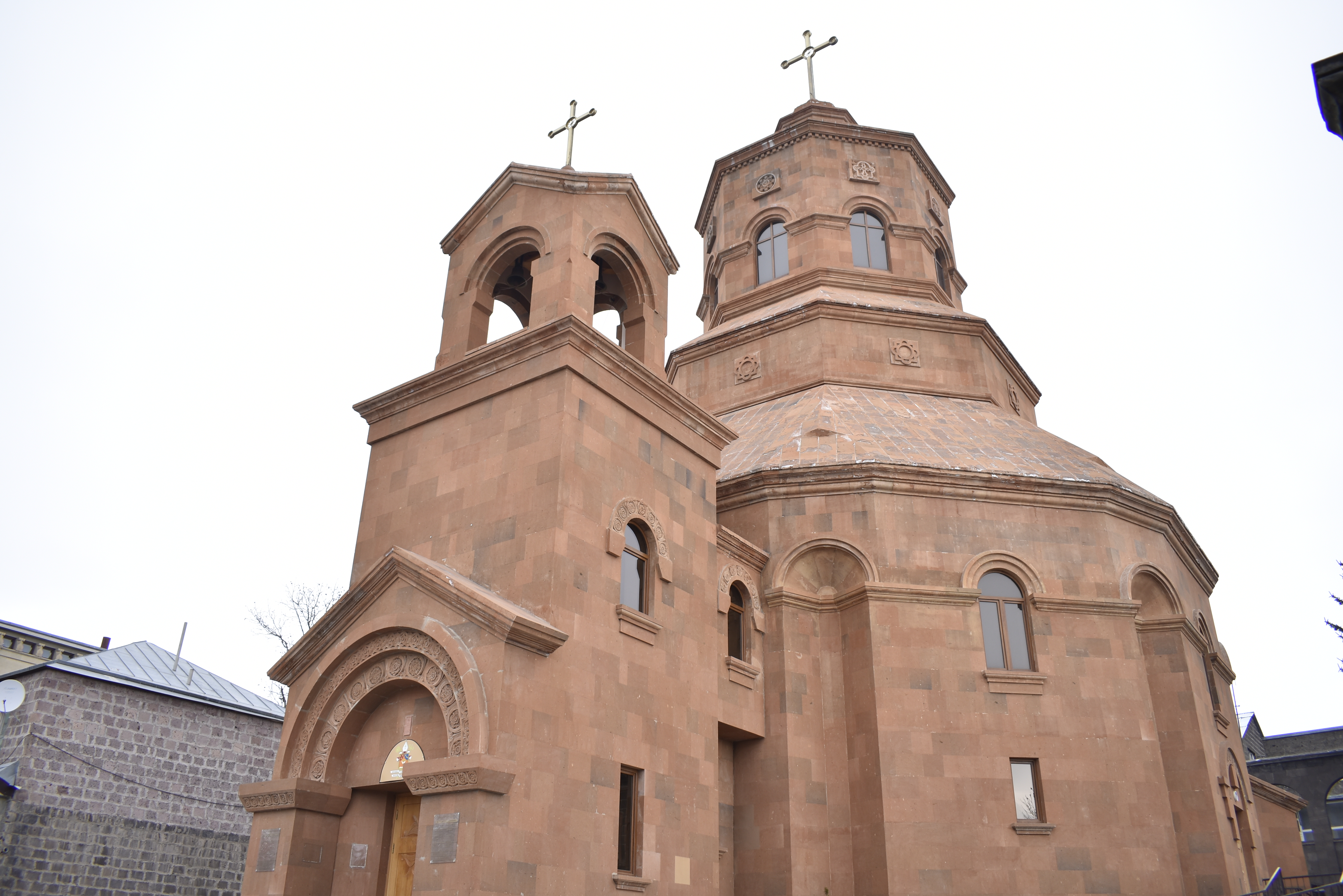

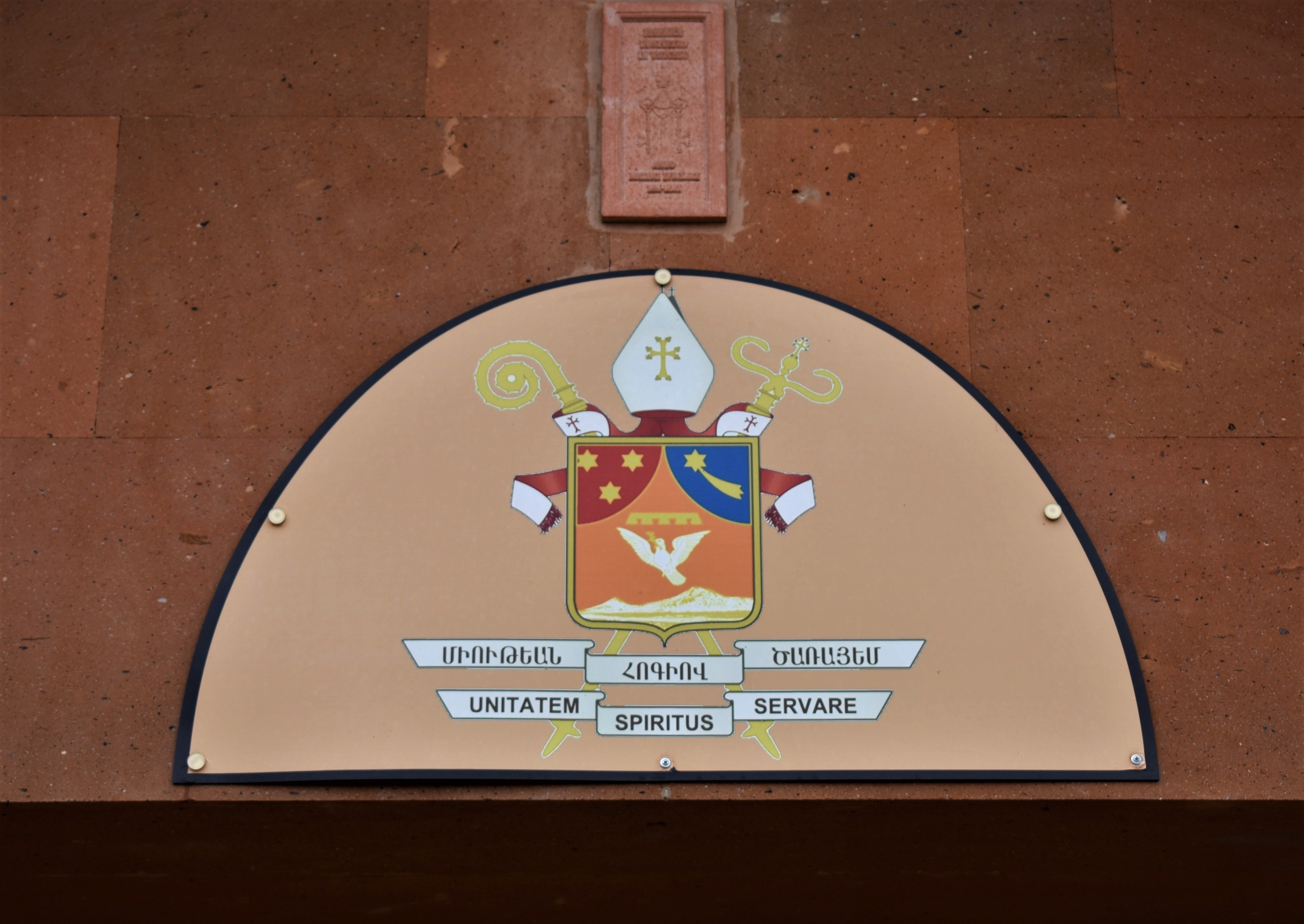
Armenian Catholic Church motto on the portal

== See also ==
- Catholic Church in Armenia
