= Katnarrat =

Katnarrat or Katnarrat or Katnarat may refer to:

- Katnarat, Lori, Armenia
- Katnarrat, Syunik, Armenia
