= Sepasar =

Sepasar may refer to:

- Mets Sepasar, Armenia
- Pokr Sepasar, Armenia
