= Maralik =

City in Shirak, Armenia

Maralik Մարալիկ
- Town
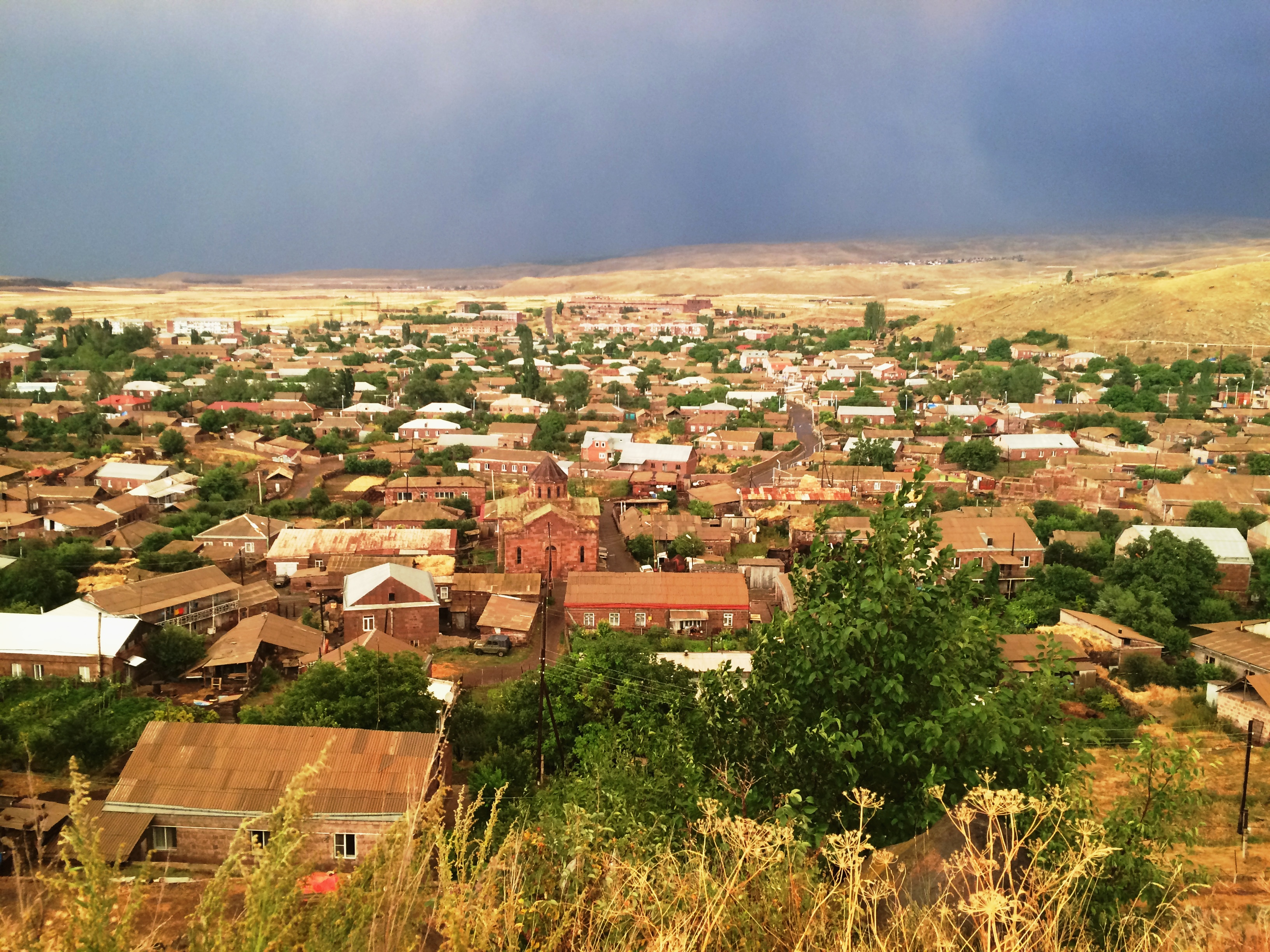
- Maralik with the Holy Mother of God Church of 1903

- Location within Armenia Location within Shirak
- Coordinates: 40°34′20″N 43°52′01″E
- Country: Armenia
- Province: Shirak
- Municipality: Ani
- Founded: 1828

Area
  - Total: 4 km^{2} (1.5 sq mi)
- Elevation: 1,720 m (5,640 ft)

Population (2022 census)
  - Total: 5,334
  - Density: 1,300/km^{2} (3,500/sq mi)
- Time zone: UTC+4
- Climate: Dfb

Maralik (Armenian: Մարալիկ) is a city in the Ani Municipality of the Shirak Province at the northwest of Armenia. As of the 2011 census, the population of the town is 5,398, down from 5,782 reported in the 2001 census. The 2016 official estimate, the population of Maralik is around 5,500. As of the 2022 census, the population of the town is 5,334.

== Etymology ==
Maralik literally means little deer in the Armenian language. According to a local traditional legend, every year on the feast of Saint Stephen, a mountain deer was willingly approaching to the Saint Stephen Monastery of the town to be sacrificed. The villagers were catching the deer and sacrificing it in honor of Saint Stephen. However, once a hunter killed the deer with his rifle. Since then, no more deer were seen in the area.

Maral and Maralik are common feminine names in the Armenian diaspora.

== History ==
Historically, Maralik has been part of the Shirak canton of the ancient Ayrarat province of Greater Armenia. During the reign of the Arsacid dynasty (52-428 AD) and later under Sasanid Persia (428-651), the area of Maralik was ruled by the Kamsarakan Armenian noble family.

With the Arab invasion of Armenia in 654, the region was granted to the Bagratid dynasty, who founded the Bagratid Kingdom of Armenia later in 885. Under the Bagratid rule, many religious and educational complexes were built in the area of present-day Maralik, according to inscriptions found among the remains of medieval Armenian churches and khachkars of the 9th and 11th centuries. After the fall of Armenia to the Byzantine Empire in 1045 and later to the Seljuk invaders in 1064, the entire region of Shirak entered an era of downfall in all aspects.

With the establishment of the Zakarid Principality of Armenia in 1201 under the Georgian protectorate, the region of Shirak, entered into a new period of growth and stability. After the Mongols captured Ani in 1236, Zakarid Armenia turned into a Mongol protectorate as part of the Ilkhanate. After the fall of the Ilkhanate in the mid-14th century, the Zakarid princes controlled over Shirak until 1360 when they fell to the invading Turkic tribes.

By the last quarter of the 14th century, the Aq Qoyunlu Sunni Oghuz Turkic tribe took over Armenia, including Shirak. In 1400, Timur invaded Armenia and Georgia, and captured more than 60,000 of the survived local people as slaves. Many districts including Shirak were depopulated. In 1410, Armenia fell under the control of the Kara Koyunlu Shia Oghuz Turkic tribe. According to the Armenian historian Thomas of Metsoph, although the Kara Koyunlu levied heavy taxes against the Armenians, the early years of their rule were relatively peaceful.

In 1501, most of the Eastern Armenian territories including Yerevan and Shirak were conquered by the emerging Safavid dynasty of Iran. Under the Iranian rule, the area around modern-day Maralik was occupied by a village known as Molla Gökche within the Erivan Khanate.

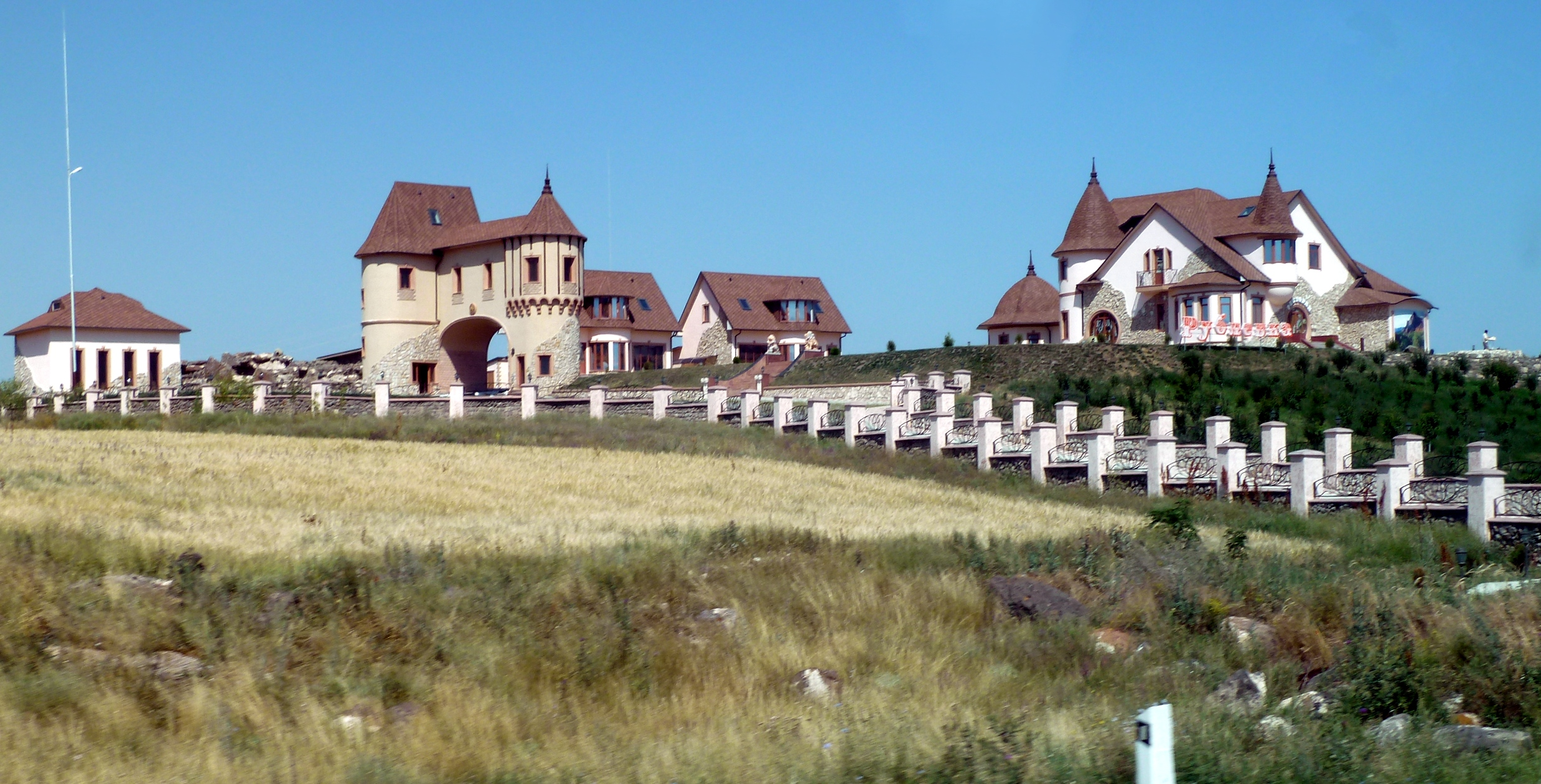
Rublyovka historic buildings in Maralik

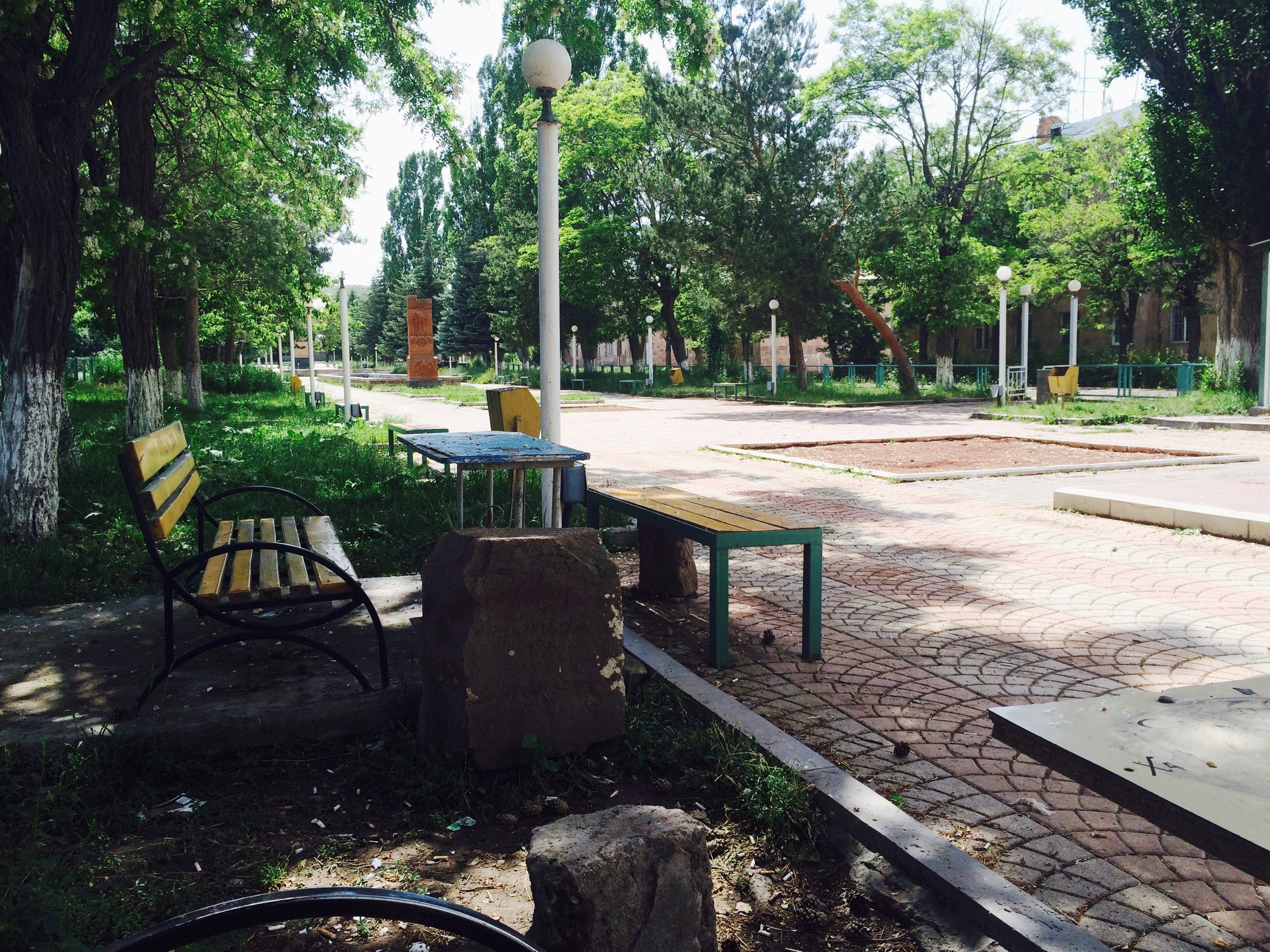
The central park

In June 1804, the Russian Empire took control of the region of Shirak at the beginning of the Russo-Persian War of 1804–1813. The area became officially part of the Russian Empire at the Treaty of Gulistan signed on 1 January 1813. 59 Western Armenian families (371 individuals) from Basean, Mush and Karin who were resettled in the area, founded an Armenian village upon their arrival in 1828, near the settlement of Molla Gökche. In 1840, the village became part of the newly formed Alexandropol Uyezd, which -in its turn- became part of the Erivan Governorate later in 1849. In 1903, the Holy Mother of God Church was consecrated, built on the foundations of a 5th-century church.

After World War I, the settlement was included within the borders of the newly founded Republic of Armenia, who enjoyed a sort-lived independence from May 1918 until December 1920, when it fell to the invading Soviet Red Army.

Under the Soviet rule, the village was renamed Kaputan in October 1927. In 1931, it became the centre of the newly formed Ani raion (known as Aghin raion until 1961). On 26 July 1935, the village of Kaputan was eventually renamed Maralik. In 1962, Maralik was given the status of a town.

Following the dissolution of the Soviet Union in 1991, Maralik became an urban community within the newly formed Shirak Province as per the administrative reforms of 1995 of independent Armenia.

== Geography ==
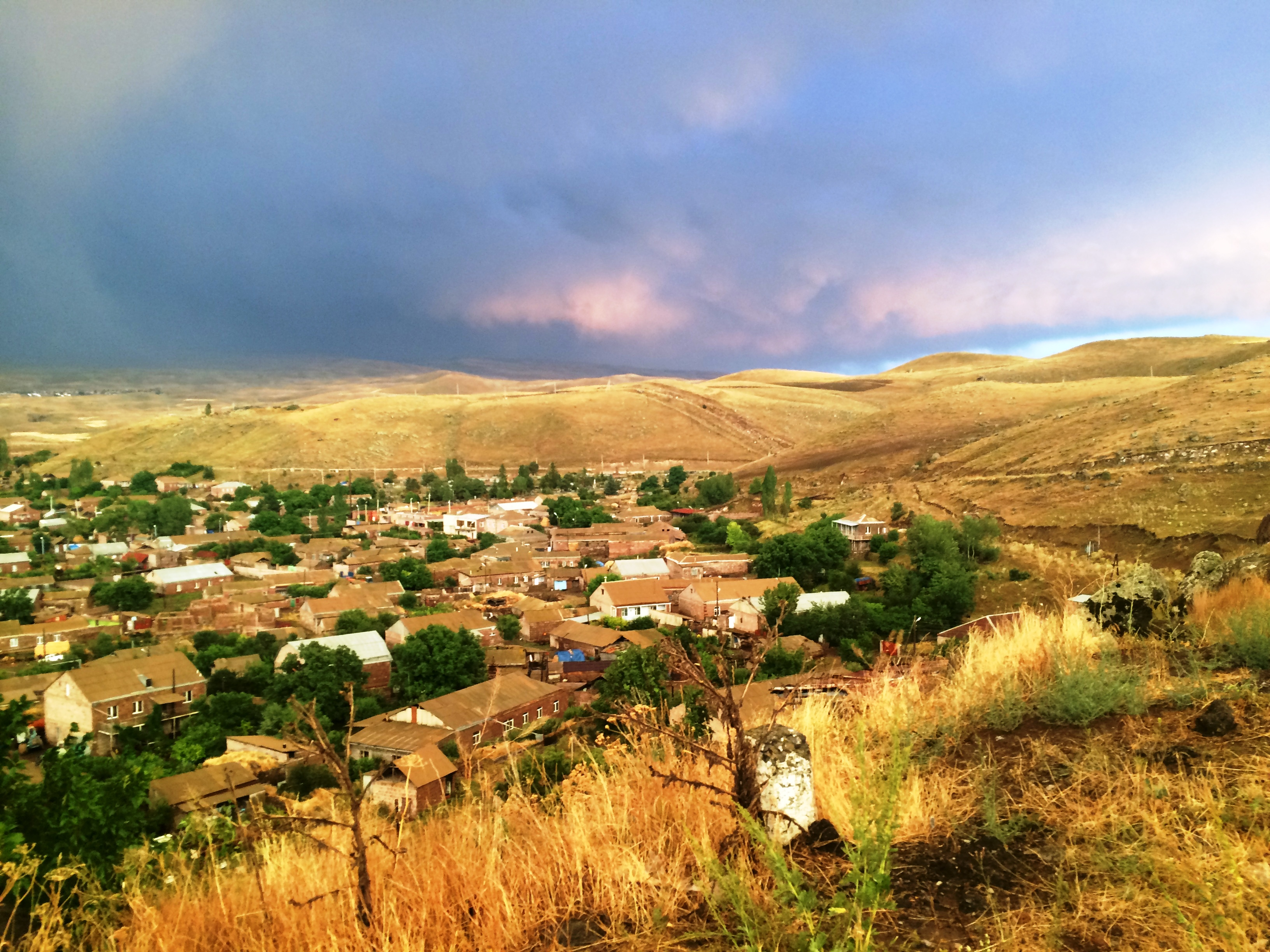
Maralik and the surrounding hills

Maralik is situated at the northwestern foot of Mount Aragats within the Shirak Plain, at a height of 1,720 meters above sea level, at a 24 km road distance south of the provincial centre Gyumri. The capital Yerevan is at a road distance of 98 km southeast of Maralik.

Surrounded with dry steppes, Maralik has a humid continental climate, characterized with mild and cool summers and extremely cold and snowy winters. The average annual precipitation is 450 mm.

The village of Dzorakap forms the southern border of the town.

== Demographics ==
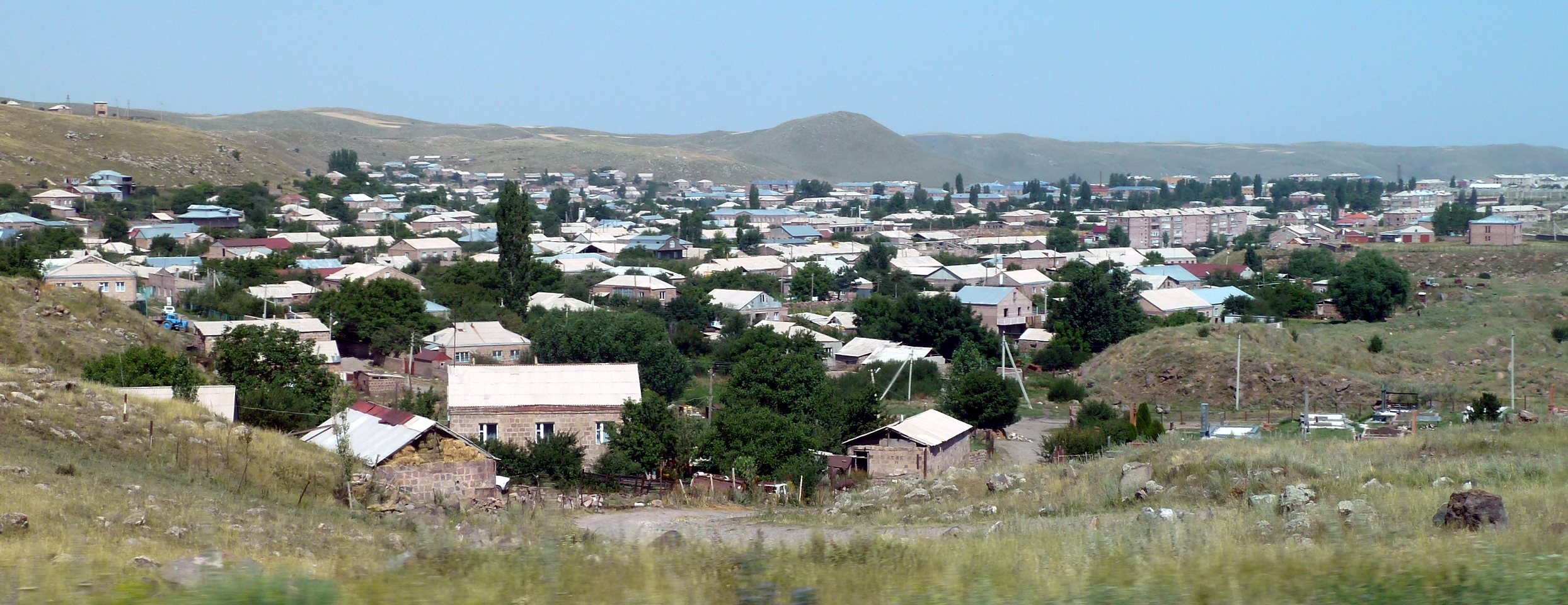
Maralik as seen from the Dzorakap village

Historical population
Year	Pop.	±% p.a.
1828	371	—
1831	971	+37.81%
1897	1,302	+0.45%
1926	1,646	+0.81%
1939	1,882	+1.04%
1959	2,177	+0.73%
1980	4,443	+3.46%
2001	5,782	+1.26%
2011	5,398	−0.68%
2022	5,334	−0.11%

== Culture ==
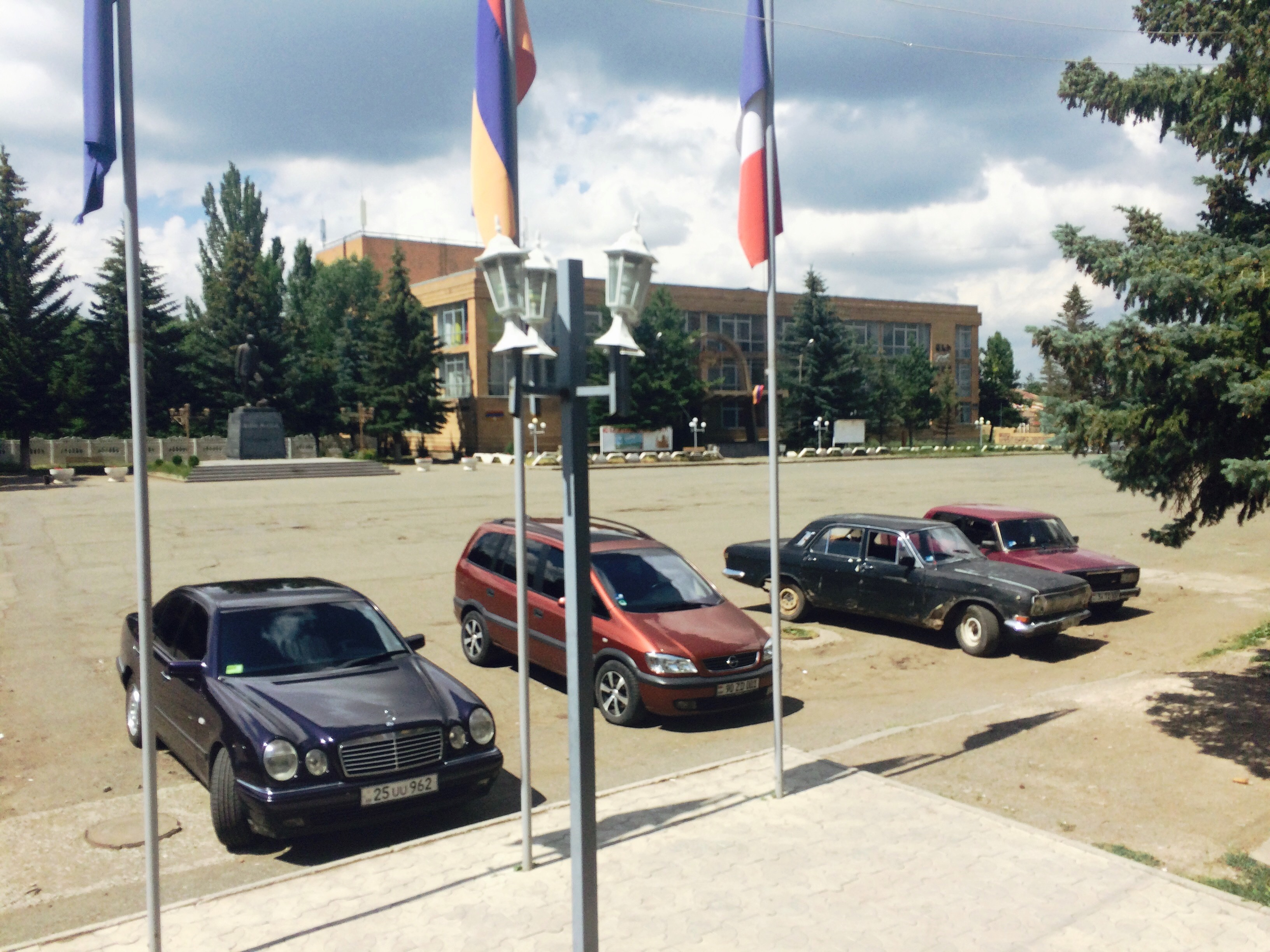
Soghomon Tehlirian square with the house of culture in the background

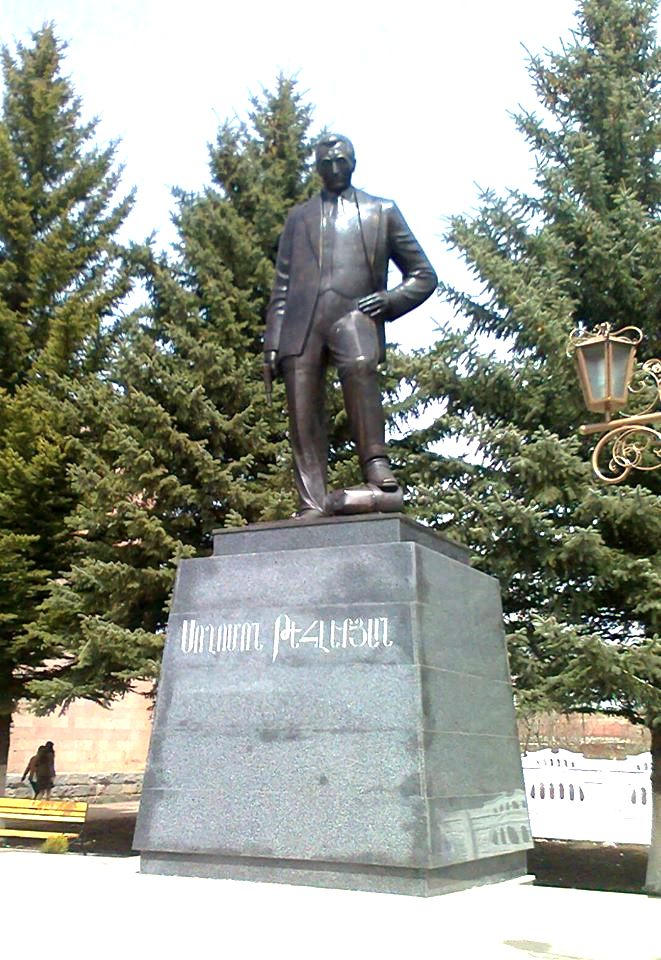
Soghomon Tehlirian's statue

Maralik is home to many historical monuments. The archaeological site at the northeastern vicinity of the town is home to a cyclopean fortress and a settlement, both dating back to the 2nd millennium BC. The Saints Paul and Peter Church, and the Church of Saint Stephen the Protomartyr (both well-preserved from the 19th century), are also found in the town, while the late medieval chapel of Ghushi is located 4.5 km southeast of Maralik.

The church of the Holy Mother of God (Red Monastery) rebuilt in 1903 on the basis of a 5th-century church, is found at the southwest of Maralik. Many khachkars, mainly from the early and late medieval periods, are found in the town.

A cultural house, a public library, a school of art, and a musical school are operating in Maralik since the Soviet days. A bronze statue of Soghomon Tehlirian was erected on April 22, 2015, at the central square of the town.

Maralik is the hometown of the fictional character Petra Arkanian in Orson Scott Card's Ender's Game series.

== Transportation ==
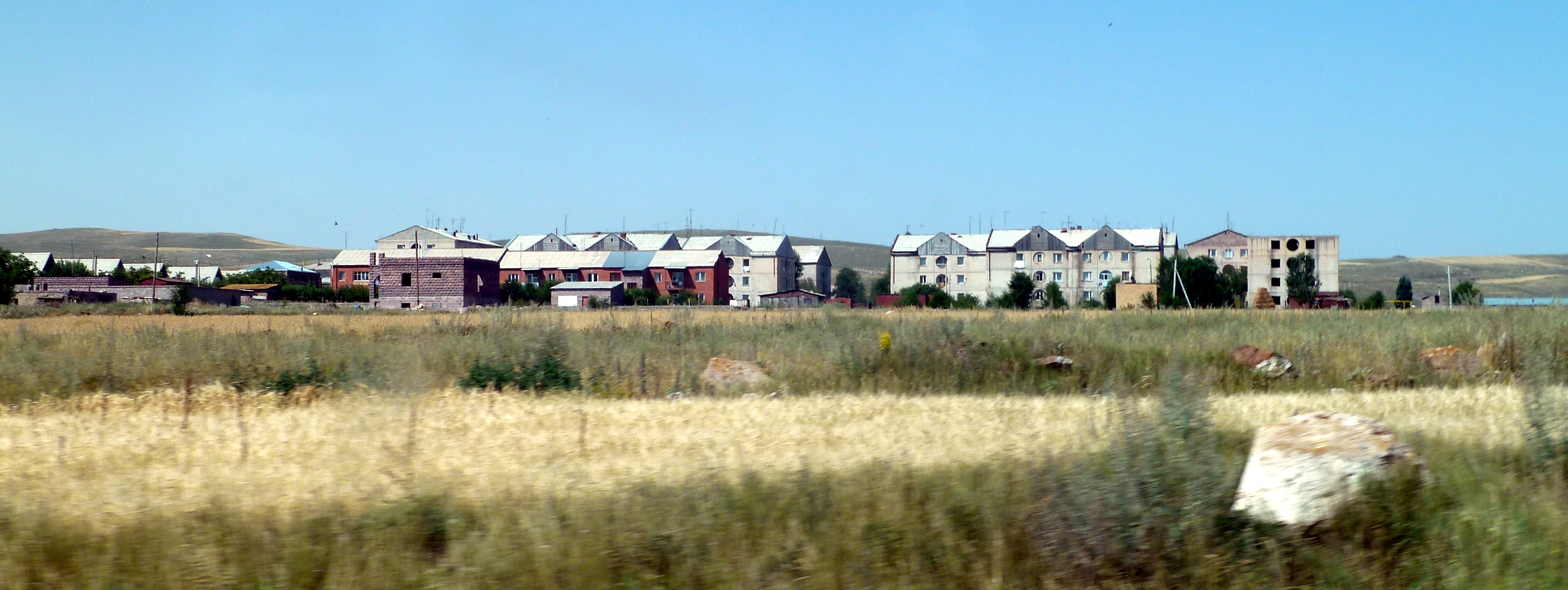
Maralik as seen from the M-1 Motorway

Maralik is located on the M-1 Motorway on the road between Gyumri and Yerevan. The town is also connected with the nearby towns and villages through a network of regional roads.

The Maralik railway station is located at the eastern vicinity of the town.

== Economy ==
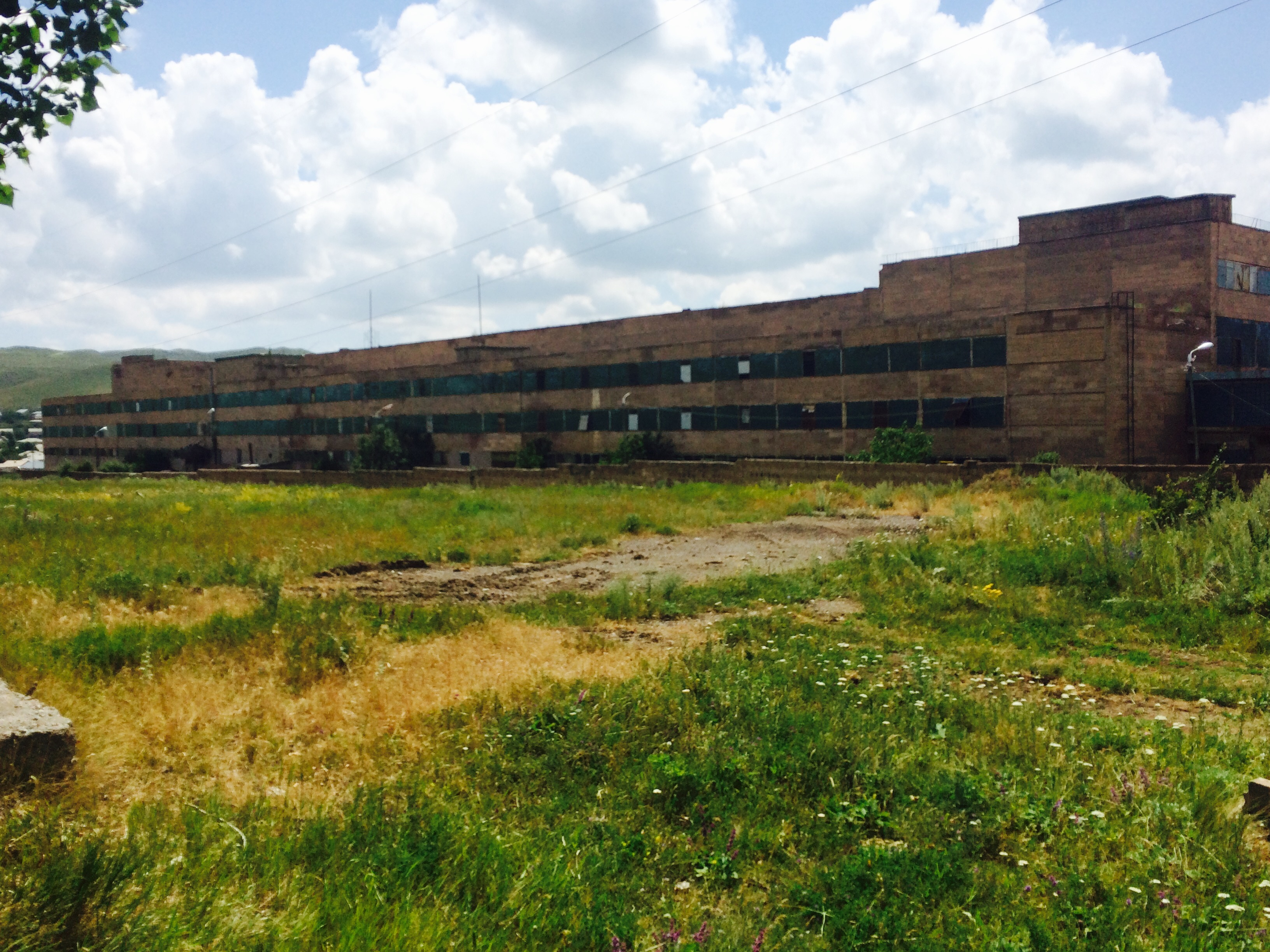
The currently-abandoned cotton-spinning factory of Maralik

Maralik was an active industrial town during the Soviet period. The currently-abandoned cotton-spinning factory of Maralik used to have more than 2000 employees at its peak during the Soviet days. The lights and electronics factory that had around 600 employees in 1962 does not operate as well. The building materials plant of the town is also inactive.

Most of the citizens in Maralik are involved in agriculture. The town is surrounded with fertile lands with the main crops being grains.

The Rublyovka historic quarter located at the north of Maralik, was recently renovated to serve as a touristic centre housing a hotel and restaurant.

== Education ==
Maralik is home to many pre-school kindergartens, 2 public education schools, as well a vocational school which is a stet-owned intermediate technical college, serving the town and its surrounding villages.

Maralik has produced many prominent scholars and scientists of Armenia, including Doctor/Professor Anushavan Kirakosyan (economics), Doctor/Professor Henrik Melikyan (history), Doctor Vladimir Darbinyan (philology), and Doctor Manvel Andikyan (mathematics),

== Sport ==
Maralik has a sport school run by the municipality. The town is served by a municipal football stadium with a limited seating capacity of 1,000.

Football is the most popular sport in Maralik, along with judo and karate. The town has produced many judo and karate champions of the Soviet Union and independent Armenia, including Aleksan Avetisyan (former president of the Armenian Olympic Committee in 1994–1999), Hakob Sukiasyan, Hrach Nazaryan, Yura Simonyan, Armen Grigoryan, Ruben Shavoyan and Alina Rubinyan.
