= Dzorakap =

Village in Shirak, Armenia

Dzorakap Ձորակապ
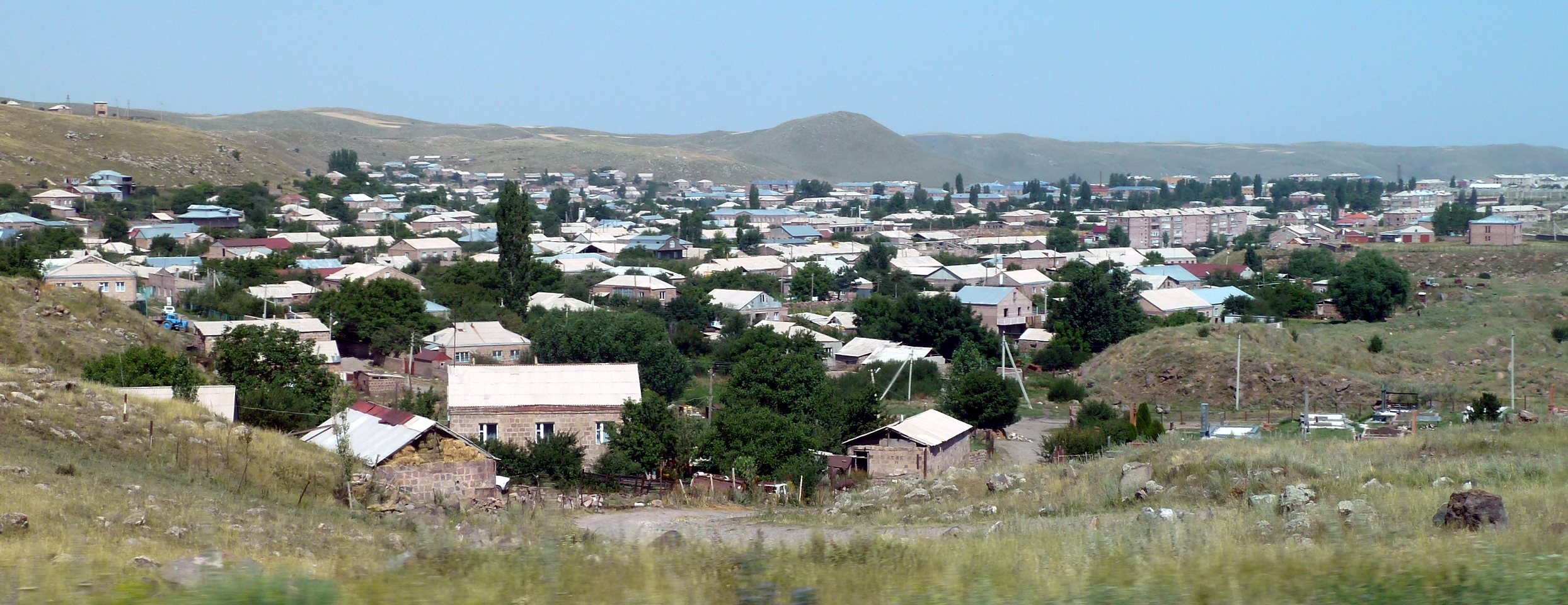
- Dzorakap

- Location within Armenia Location within Shirak
- Coordinates: 40°34′N 43°52′E
- Country: Armenia
- Province: Shirak
- Municipality: Ani
- Elevation: 1,800 m (5,900 ft)

Population (2011)
  - Total: 948
- Time zone: UTC+4
  - Summer (DST): UTC+5

Dzorakap (Armenian: Ձորակապ) is a village in the Ani Municipality of the Shirak Province of Armenia.

== Demographics ==
Historical population
Year	Pop.	±% p.a.
1831	182	—
1897	836	+2.34%
1926	962	+0.49%
1939	908	−0.44%
1959	658	−1.60%
1970	878	+2.66%
1979	961	+1.01%
2001	1,039	+0.36%
2011	948	−0.91%

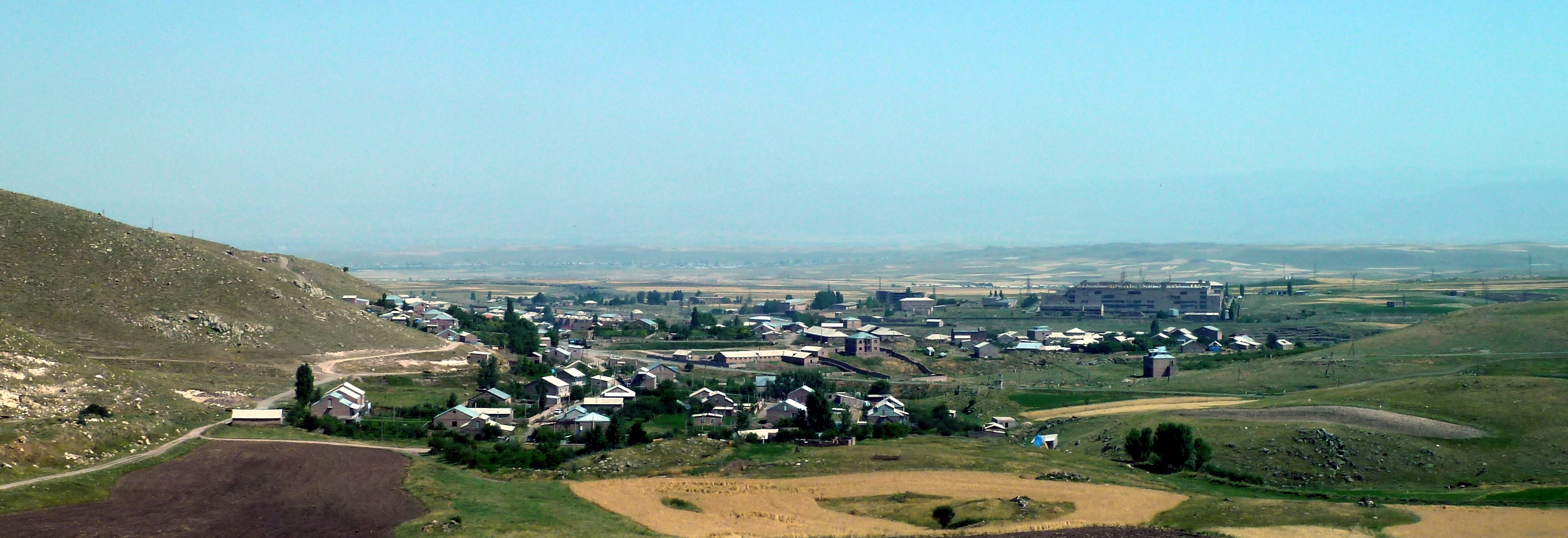
Dzorakap near Maralik as seen from the highway
