= Nerses Der Nersessian =

Armenian archbishop (1920–2006)

Nerses Der Nersessian, C.A.M.
- Coadjutor Ordinary of Ordinariate for Catholics of Armenian Rite in Eastern Europe
- Church: Armenian Catholic Church
- Appointed: 13 July 1991
- Other post(s): Titular Archbishop of Sebaste of the Armenians (1991–2006)

Orders
- Ordination: 8 September 1946 (Priest)
- Consecration: 17 November 1992 (Bishop) by Pope John Paul II

Personal details
- Born: Nerses Der Nersessian; 16 November 1920; Berlin, Republic of Weimar (now Germany)
- Died: 24 December 2006 (aged 86); Gyumri, Armenia

Nerses Der Nersessian, C.A.M (16 November 1920 – 24 December 2006) was an Armenian Catholic archbishop and first ordinary for the Armenian believers in Eastern Europe.

== Life ==
Born on 16 November 1920 in Berlin, Nerses Der Nersessian studied in Bucharest's and Sofia's schools and at Murat-Rapaelyan College in Venice (1933–1939). He became a member of the Mekhitarist Congregation of Venice in 1940. Nersessian was ordained priest on 8 September 1946 by the Mekhitarist order.

He graduated from Pontifical Gregorian University in 1947, was the "Mkhitaryan Family" magazine editor (1948–1952), "Bazmavep"'s editor (1957–1979, with interruptions), general secretary of the Congregation (1964–1976 and since 1982), archives director (1976–1982). For many years he taught in the St. Lazarus' Heritage School and Murat-Rapaelyan College. Nersessian also published Arakel Syunetsi's Documentary (1956, Prologue, Study and Dictionary, Ter-Nersisyan), Mkhitar Sebastatsi's "Thinking Against the Rescuer" (1969, The Prophets of Ter-Nersisyan) and others. He has also featured some articles on Dante's "Divine Comedy" translate them to Armenian language, Voskan Yeremans' grammatical perceptions and the history of the Mekhitarist Congregation in Armenian language spelling, and so on.

After his priestly ordination, Father Nersessian also worked in 1982 as a librarian at the Mekhitarist monastery on the island of San Lazzaro in Venice. Later he was Abbot General of the Mechitarists in Venice. On 13 July 1991 he was appointed archbishop "ad personam" at the same time ordinary of the Armenian Catholic Church in Eastern Europe.

After his appointment as titular Archbishop of Sebaste of the Armenians on 9 July 1992 he received from Pope John Paul II on 17 November 1992, his episcopal ordination. His co-consecrators were the Patriarch of Cilicia Archbishop Hovhannes Bedros XVIII Kasparian, ICPB, Bishop Grégoire Ghabroyan, ICPB, of Paris and Vartan Achkarian, CAM, who was Auxiliary bishop in Beirut.

From 17 February 2001 to 2 April 2005 Archbishop Vartan Kechichian (Titular Archbishop of Mardin of the Armenians) was appointed as Coadjutor bishop. After his retirement on 2 April 2005, he served as Professor Emeritus of Eastern Europe until his death on 24 December 2006, succeeding Nechan Karakéhéyan, I.C.P.B.

He died in 2006 in Gyumri.
