= Dzithankov =

Village in Shirak, Armenia

Dzithankov Ձիթհանքով
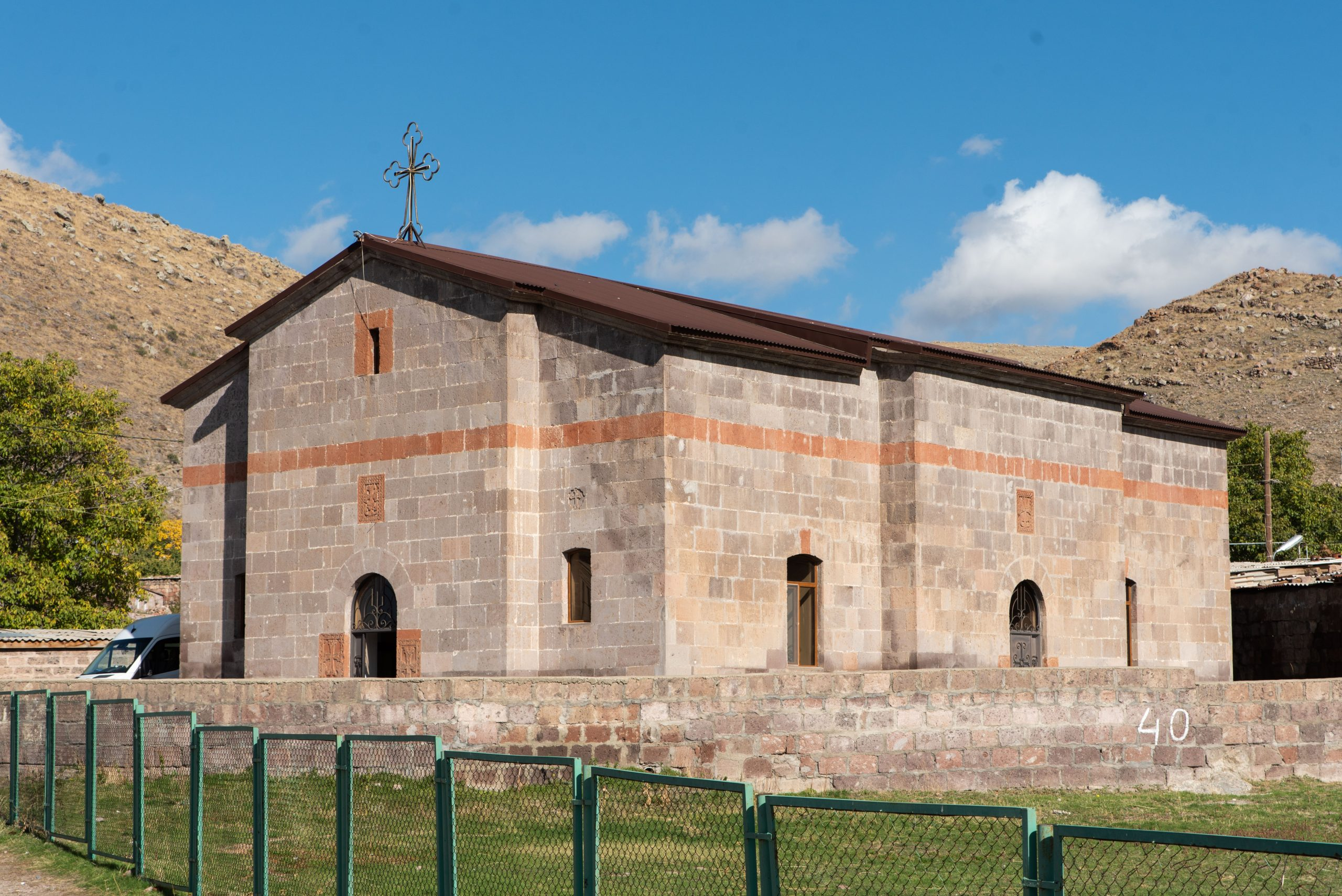
- St. Holy Mother of God Church Dzithankov

- Location within Armenia Location within Shirak
- Coordinates: 40°30′56″N 43°48′48″E
- Country: Armenia
- Province: Shirak
- Municipality: Ani
- Elevation: 1,740 m (5,710 ft)

Population (2011)
  - Total: 1,308
- Time zone: UTC+4
  - Summer (DST): UTC+5

Dzithankov (Armenian: Ձիթհանքով) is a village in the Ani Municipality of the Shirak Province of Armenia.

== Demographics ==
Historical population
Year	Pop.	±% p.a.
1873	633	—
1897	1,065	+2.19%
1906	1,260	+1.89%
1926	1,406	+0.55%
1939	1,708	+1.51%
1959	1,580	−0.39%
1970	1,372	−1.28%
1979	1,259	−0.95%
2001	1,332	+0.26%
2011	1,308	−0.18%
