= Dzitoghtsyan Museum of National Architecture =

Coordinates: 40°46′53″N 43°50′44″E

- Ձիթողցյանների քաղաքային կենցաղի և ազգային ճարատարապետության տուն-թանգարան
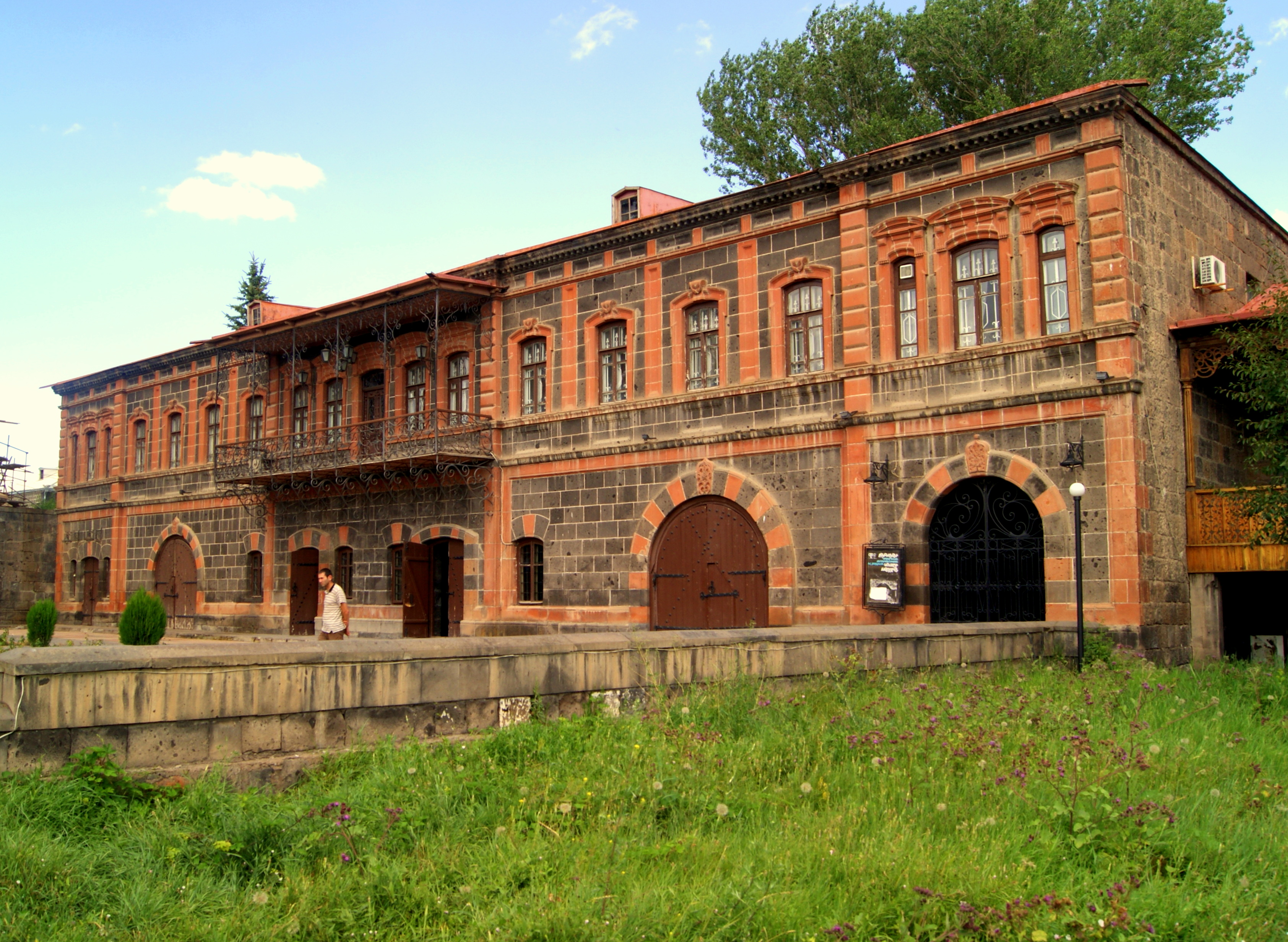
- Dzitoghtsyan Museum
- Established: 1984
- Location: Gyumri, Armenia
- Type: Popular art, social life, architecture
- Director: Sona Harutyunyan

The Dzitoghtsyan House-Museum of Social Life and National Architecture (Armenian: Ձիթողցյանների քաղաքային կենցաղի և ազգային ճարատարապետության տուն-թանգարան), is a museum located in the historic Kumayri district of Gyumri, Armenia. It was founded in 1984 as the Dzitoghtsyan family house, which dates back to the 19th century. The museum exhibits elements of daily urban life in Gyumri, as well as the local cultural and architectural characteristics of the city.

The house was built in 1872 by four brothers who had migrated from the Ottoman Armenian village of Dzitogh. It is built with the famous red tufa stone local to the Shirak region.

The house-museum exhibits a collection of Alexandropol's urban life from the 19th century up to the 1920s. It also houses cultural, architectural and religious objects of the city.
