= Petrovka, Armenia =

Petrovka Պետրովկա
- Location within Armenia
- Coordinates: 41°9′N 44°19′E
- Country: Armenia
- Marz (Province): Lori
- Elevation: 1,530 m (5,020 ft)

Population (2011)
  - Total: 243
- Time zone: UTC+4

Petrovka (Armenian: Պետրովկա) is a village in the Lori Province of Armenia. The village was populated by non-religious Russians deported from the Tsarist Russian Empire. The Russians were replaced with Azerbaijanis before the exodus of Azerbaijanis from Armenia after the outbreak of the Nagorno-Karabakh conflict. In 1988-1989 Armenian refugees from Azerbaijan settled in the village.
