= Nechan Karakéhéyan =

Armenian Catholic archbishop (1932–2021)

His Excellency Nechan Karakéhéyan I.C.P.B.
- Ordinary of Ordinariate for Catholics of Armenian Rite in Eastern Europe
- Native name: Նշան Արքեպս. Գարաքեհեյան
- Church: Armenian Catholic Church
- Diocese: Ordinariate for Catholics of Armenian Rite in Eastern Europe
- Appointed: 2 April 2005
- Term ended: 6 January 2010
- Predecessor: Nerses Der Nersessian
- Successor: Raphaël Minassian
- Other posts: Armenian Catholic Bishop of Isfahan (2001-2005); Armenian Catholic Ordinary of Greece (1991-2000)
- Previous post: Armenian Catholic Bishop of Isfahan (2001–2005)

Orders
- Ordination: 2 July 1960
- Consecration: 28 January 2001 by Nerses Bedros XIX Tarmouni

Personal details
- Born: Եղիա Գարաքեհեյան (Yeghia Karakéhéyan); 17 April 1932 Piraeus, Greece
- Died: 15 February 2021 (aged 88) Yerevan, Armenia
- Denomination: Armenian Catholic
- Residence: Armenia
- Education: Armenian Pontifical College; Pontifical Gregorian University

Nechan Karakéhéyan, I.C.P.B. (17 April 1932 – 15 February 2021) was an Armenian Catholic archbishop, ordinary of Eastern Europe for Armenian Catholics (2005-2010), Armenian Catholic bishop of Isfahan (2001-2003) and Armenian Catholic ordinary of Greece for Armenian Catholics (1991-2000), titular archbishop of Adana degli Armeni.

== Life ==
Nechan Karakéhéyan joined the Congregation of the Patriarchal Congregation of Bzommar Institute and received on 2 July 1960 his ordination to the priesthood. Pope John Paul II appointed him in 1991 Ordinary to the Armenian Catholics in Greece. On 27 September 2000 he was appointed Bishop of Isfahan.

The Patriarch of Cilicia Nerses Bedros XIX, ordained him on 28 January next year to episcopate, being his co-consecrators Gregory Ghabroyan, Bishop of the Armenian Catholic Eparchy of Sainte-Croix-de-Paris and Manuel Batakian, bishop of the Armenian Catholic Eparchy of Our Lady of Nareg in the United States of America and Canada.

On 7 January 2003 Karakéhéyan was appointed Apostolic Administrator to Greece. On 2 April 2005 he was appointed Ordinary to Eastern Europe and Titular Archbishop of Adana degli Armeni. On 6 January 2010 Pope Benedict XVI accepted his age-related withdrawal.

As a bishop-emeritus he lived at the Armenian Catholic mission in Yerevan, where he died on 15 February 2021.
