= Saratovka, Armenia =

Saratovka Սարատովկա
- Location within Armenia
- Coordinates: 41°04′41″N 44°18′59″E
- Country: Armenia
- Marz (Province): Lori
- Elevation: 1,480 m (4,860 ft)

Population (2011)
  - Total: 424
- Time zone: UTC+4 ( )
  - Summer (DST): UTC+5 ( )

Saratovka (Armenian: Սարատովկա) is a town in the Lori Province of Armenia.
