= Mets Sepasar =

Mets Sepasar Մեծ Սեպասար
- Location within Armenia Location within Shirak
- Coordinates: 41°02′57″N 43°49′24″E
- Country: Armenia
- Province: Shirak
- Municipality: Ashotsk

Population (2011)
  - Total: 841
- Time zone: UTC+4
  - Summer (DST): UTC+5

Mets Sepasar (Armenian: Մեծ Սեպասար) is a village in the Ashotsk Municipality of the Shirak Province of Armenia.

== Etymology ==
The village was previously known as Shishtapa mets (Շիշթափա մեծ), Shishtapa I (Շիշթափա I), and Shishtapa-hay (Շիշթափա-հայ).

== Demographics ==
The population of the village since 1831 is as follows:

Year	Population	Note
1831	64	100% Armenian
1873	281	100% Armenian
1886	396	100% Armenian
1897	620	610 Armenians, 10 others, 316 males
1904	750	Mostly Armenian
1914	863	100% Armenian
1916	796	100% Armenian
1919	1,300	100% Armenian
1922	738	100% Armenian
1926	893	884 Armenians, 9 Russians, 445 males
1931	997	100% Armenian
1939	1,161	
1959	761	
1978	846	
1989	930	
2001	900	
2011	841	
