= Katnarat, Lori =

Katnarat Կաթնառատ
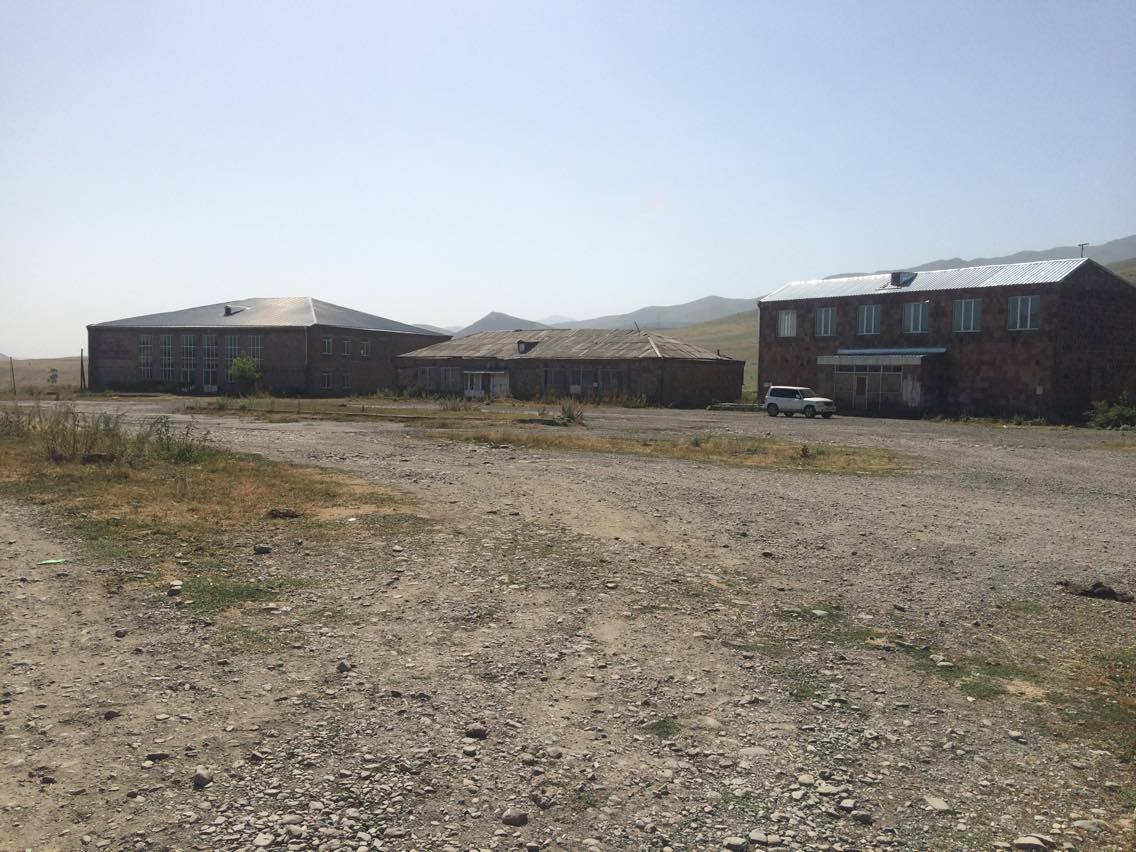

- Location within Armenia
- Coordinates: 41°05′18″N 44°10′46″E
- Country: Armenia
- Marz (Province): Lori
- Elevation: 1,540 m (5,050 ft)

Population (2011)
  - Total: 880
- Time zone: UTC+4 ( )
  - Summer (DST): UTC+5 ( )

Katnarat (Armenian: Կաթնառատ, also Romanized as Kat’narrat and Katnarrat; formerly, Lorplemsovkhoz, Loriyskiy Sovkhoz) is a town in the Lori Province of Armenia. The town was originally a sovkhoz (collective farm).

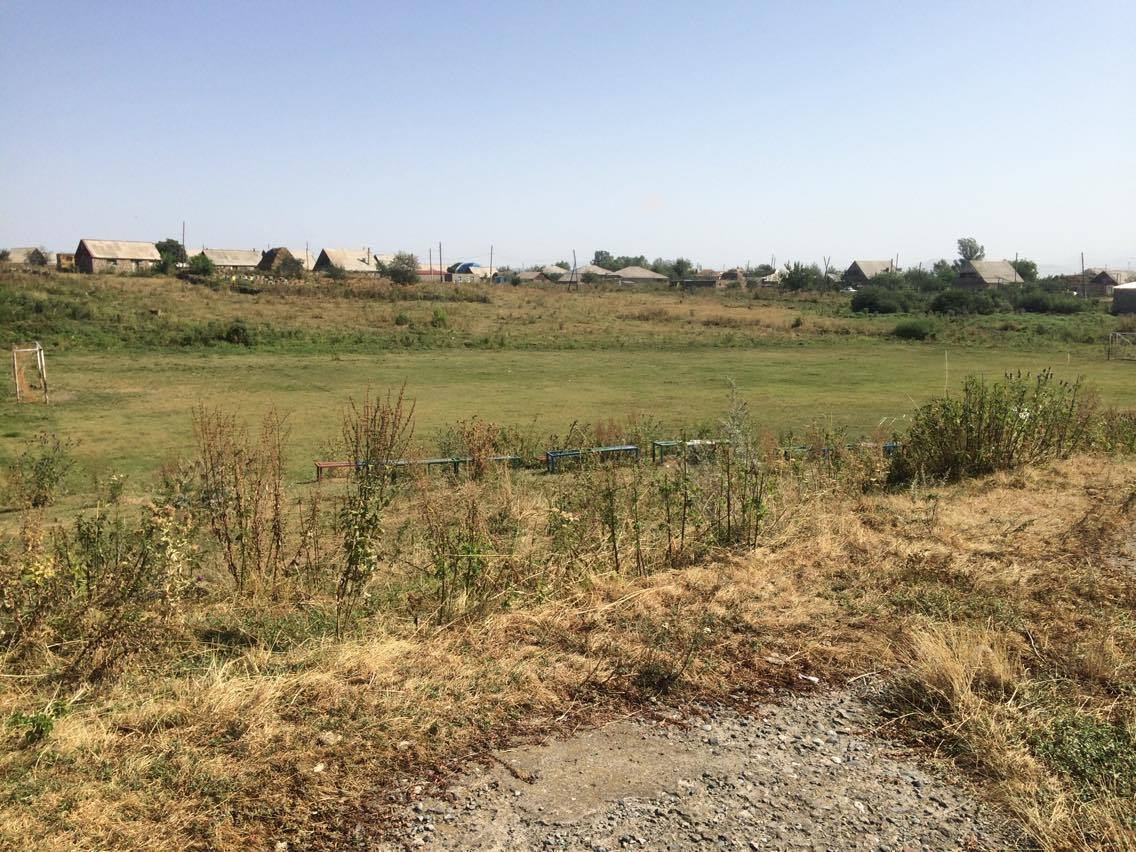
Katnarat, Lori
