= Ordinariate for Catholics of Armenian Rite in Eastern Europe =

Eastern Catholic ecclesiastical jurisdiction in Eastern Europe

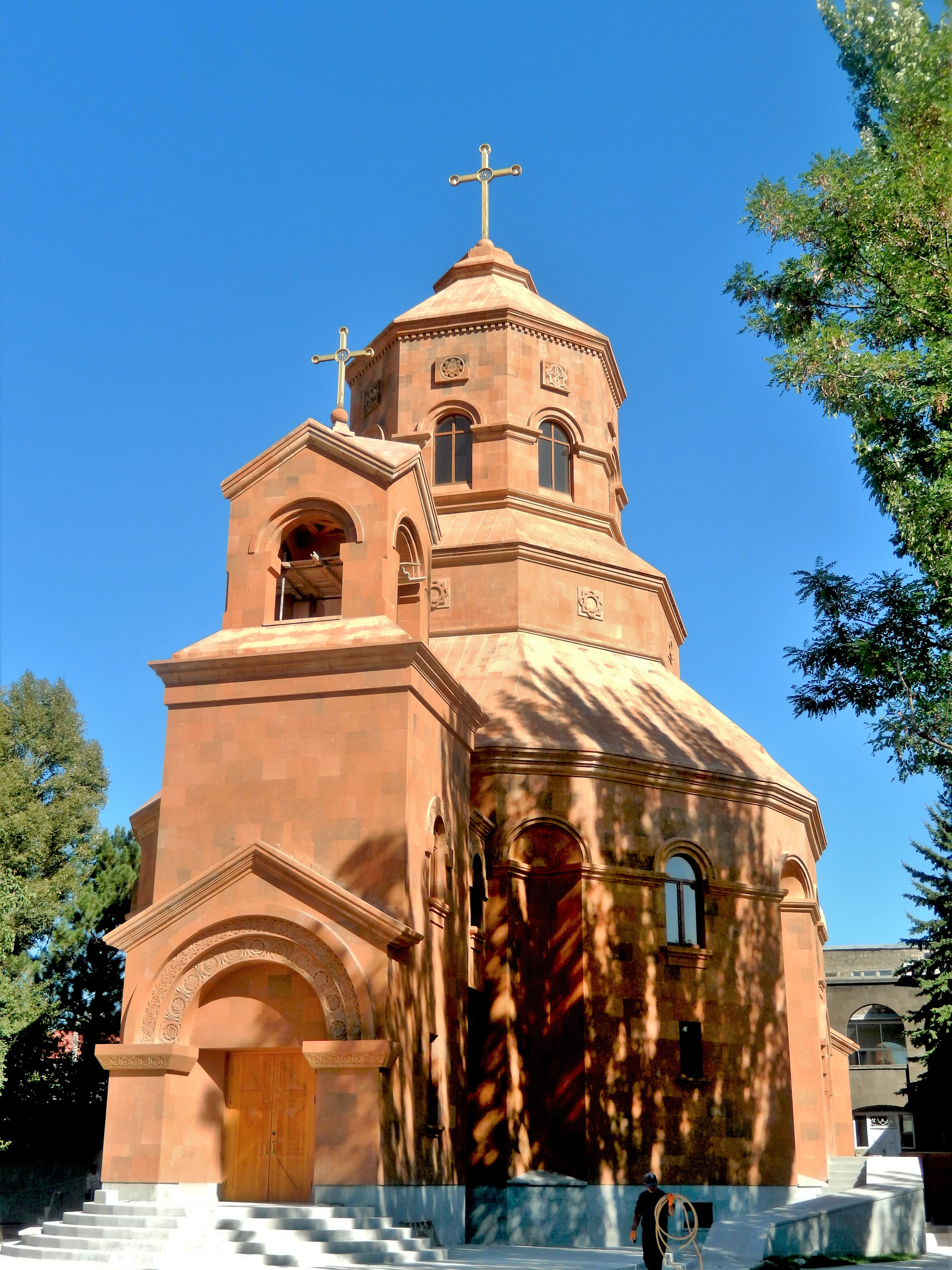

Location
- Country: Armenia, Belarus, Estonia, Georgia, Latvia, Lithuania, Russia, Ukraine

Statistics
- Population: (as of 2016); 618,000
- Parishes: 44

Information
- Denomination: Catholic Church
- Sui iuris church: Armenian Catholic Church
- Rite: Armenian Rite
- Established: 13 July 1991
- Cathedral: Cathedral of the Holy Martyrs, Gyumri

Current leadership
- Pope: Leo XIV
- Patriarch: Raphaël Bedros XXI Minassian
- Bishop: Kevork Noradounguian, I.C.P.B.

The Armenian Catholic Ordinariate of Eastern Europe is an Ordinariate (quasi-diocese) of the Armenian Catholic Church (Eastern Catholic, Armenian Rite in Armenian language) for its faithful in certain Eastern European ex-Soviet countries without proper Ordinary for their particular church sui iuris.

It is exempt, i.e. immediately subject to the Holy See (notably the Roman Congregation for the Oriental Churches), not part of any ecclesiastical province.

== History ==
Between 1720 and 1760 large communities of Armenian Catholic refugees from Turkey and Persia settled in the territory of the North Caucasus. The flow of Armenian immigrants to Christian Russia increased with the Armenian genocide executed by the Turkish authorities, especially since the late nineteenth century. Some of the faithful were able to take refuge in southern Armenia and Georgia. From 1907 in Krasnodar there was a special vicar for priests of the Armenian Catholic rite. In 1760 the Catholics in Astrakhan were 1/5 of the population of the city and they had a parish. Armenian Catholic communities were established in Astrakhan, Voronezh, Penza, Rostov-on-Don, Saratov, Samara and Tsaritsyn.

Another region of mass residence of Armenian Catholics was Georgia, in Ajaltsije, Ajalkalaki, Bogdanovsky and Chirac. In 1848 the Diocese of Tiraspol was created with headquarters in Saratov, to which the Armenian Catholic parishes were added in Russian territory as a dean. In 1850 Pope Pius IX established an Armenian eparchy of Artvin for the Catholic Armenian faithful of the Ottoman Empire and Russia. In 1878 Russia occupied all the territory of this eparchy and, by decision of the authorities, subjected its parishes to the Latin diocese of Tiraspol. However, this situation was not recognized by Rome until 1912, but the eparchy of Artvin formally continued to exist until 1972.

In 1909 the pope appointed Sarkis Der Aprahamian as apostolic administrator for Armenian Catholics, as a formal part of Artvin's non-existent eparchy. In the 7 ecclesiastical districts of the administration there were 86 parishes: Alexandropol or Gyumri (16 parishes), Lori (6 parishes), Ajalkalaki (12 parishes), Ajaltsije (17 parishes), Artvin (17 parishes), Karin (12 parishes) and Crimea (6 parishes).

The current Armenian Catholic community in the Caucasus and southern Russia and Ukraine arose during the Armenian emigration from Turkey after the peace treaties at the end of the First World War. With the fall of the communist regime, which had almost suppressed the Armenian Catholic Church in the Soviet Union, on 13 July 1991, Pope John Paul II established the Ordinariate for the faithful of the Armenian rite who live in countries of Eastern Europe (except Poland, Romania and Greece) for Armenian Catholics in the former Soviet republics of Armenia, Georgia, Russia and Ukraine. The priest of the Mekhitarist Order, Nerses Der Nersessian, was appointed first ordinary and consecrated bishop on 17 November 1992.

=== Armenian Catholic Eparchy of Lviv and its incorporation to ordinariate ===
In 1630 in Lviv the Armenian Apostolic Archbishop Mikołaj Torosowicz united his Church with the Catholic Church and received the Metropolitan title of Archbishop of Poland, Moldavia and Wallachia of the Armenian Catholic Archeparchy of Lviv. It existed until its suppression by the Soviet communist authorities in 1945 in the areas of western Ukraine that had belonged to the Austro-Hungarian Empire and were annexed by the Soviet Union at the end of the Second World War. The faithful were transferred to Siberia or took refuge in Poland and the bishop died in prison. After the end of communism the archeparchy was not revived - although it was not suppressed, its cathedral of the Assumption of Mary was delivered by the Government to the Armenian Apostolic Church and its territory incorporated into the Ordinariate.

== Territory and statistics ==
The ordinariate includes the jurisdiction over all Armenian Catholics in Armenia, Georgia, Russia and Ukraine. The Cathedral of the Holy Martyrs in Gyumri, northwest of Armenia, is the cathedral episcopal see of the ordinariate.

In Russia, the faithful of the Armenian Catholic Church live mainly in the southern regions of the country and in large cities: Pskov, Rostov-on-Don, Krasnodar, Sochi, Irkutsk, Omsk, Ulan Ude and Chita. Because of the lack of their own Armenian Catholic hierarchy and clergymen, the faithful of the Armenian Catholic Church mostly visit the Latin parishes. In every Latin eparchies of Russia, there are clergymen (mostly Armenians) who are ordained by the Ordinariate of Eastern Europe with jurisdiction over the faithful of the Armenian Catholic Church residing in these Latin dioceses. In Moscow there is the "Parish of St. Grigor the Illuminator", whose services are performed in the Latin Cathedral of the Immaculate Conception.

Also in Ukraine, due to the smallness of the Armenian clergy, the communities are often entrusted to the Latin-rite clergy.

In Georgia there is the parish of Saint Gregory the Illuminator in Tbilisi.

In 2016, there were 618,000 believers in 44 parishes. Especially in Russia and Ukraine, the faithful are entrusted to the Latin priests because of their small number.

== Ordinaries ==
Ordinaries of East Europe (Armenian Rite)

- Nerses Der Nersessian, C.A.M. (1991.07.13 – 2005.04.02), Archbishop ad personam (1991.07.13 – 1992.07.09), then (also emeritate) Titular Archbishop of Sebaste of the Armenians (1992.07.09 – death 2006.12.24)
  - Coadjutor Ordinary Vartan Kechichian, C.A.M. (2001.02.17 – 2005.04.02)
- Neshan Karakéhéyan, I.C.P.B. (2005.04.02 – 2010.01.06), Titular Archbishop of Adana of the Armenians (2005.04.02 – death 2021.02.15)
  - Apostolic Administrator Father Vahan Ohanian, C.A.M. (2010.01.06 – 2011.06.24)
- Raphaël François Minassian, I.C.P.B. (2011.06.24 – 2021.09.23), Titular Archbishop of Cesarea in Cappadocia of the Armenians (2011.06.24 – 2021.09.23)
  - Apostolic Administrator Father Mikael Bassalé, I.C.P.B. (2022.05.17 – 2024.08.21)
- Kevork Noradounguian, I.C.P.B. (since 2024.08.21)

== See also ==
- List of Catholic dioceses (structured view)
- Armenian Catholic Archeparchy of Lviv
- Ordinariate for Eastern Catholic faithful

== Sources and external links ==
- Official website
- Older site
- GCatholic with incumbent bio links
- Catholic-hierarchy.org
- armeniancatholic.org
- Armenian Catholics of Russia (in Russian)
