= Vartan Kechichian =

Vartan Kechichian, C.A.M.
- Coadjutor Ordinary of Ordinariate for Catholics of Armenian Rite in Eastern Europe
- Church: Armenian Catholic Church
- Appointed: 17 February 2001
- Term ended: 2 April 2005
- Other posts: Abbot Primate of Mekhitarists (1997–2000), Titular Archbishop of Mardin for Armenians (2001–2017)

Orders
- Ordination: 8 September 1959 (Priest)
- Consecration: 13 May 2001 (Bishop) by Nerses Bedros XIX Tarmouni

Personal details
- Born: Vartan Kechichian; 13 September 1933 Kessab, Syrian Republic (now Syria)
- Died: 22 November 2017 (aged 84) Lido di Venezia, Italy

Archbishop Vartan Kechichian, C.A.M. (Armenian: Վարդան Քեչիչյան; 13 September 1933 – 22 November 2017) was a Syrian-born Armenian Catholic hierarch. He served as a Titular Archbishop of Mardin for Armenians and Coadjutor Ordinary of Ordinariate for Catholics of Armenian Rite in Eastern Europe from 17 February 2001 until his retirement on 2 April 2005.

== Life ==
Archbishop Kechichian was born in the Armenian family in diaspora, in Syria. After the school graduation, he subsequently joined the Order of the Mechitarists in Venice, where he made a solemn profession on 15 August 1956. He was ordained as priest on 8 September 1959, after studies in the Pontifical Gregorian University, Italy (1953–1959) with a licentiate in philosophy and theology.

After his ordination to priesthood, he served in the different Mechitarists institutions in Italy, Lebanon, France, Argentina and Syria and in the same time made a pastoral work for the Armenian Catholics. Also from 1997 until 2000 he served as an Abbot Primate of Mekhitarists.

On 17 February 2001 Vardapet Kechichian was nominated by Pope John Paul II and on 13 May 2001 consecrated to the Episcopate as a Coadjutor Ordinary. The principal consecrator was Patriarch Nerses Bedros XIX Tarmouni, the Head of the Armenian Catholic Church.

Archbishop Kechichian retired from office, before reaching the age limit. He died on 22 November 2017 at age 84.

Catholic Church titles
Preceded by Vartán Waldir Boghossian	Titular Archbishop of Mardin for Armenians; 2001–2017	Succeeded by Vacant
