= Azatan =

Village in Shirak, Armenia

Azatan Ազատան
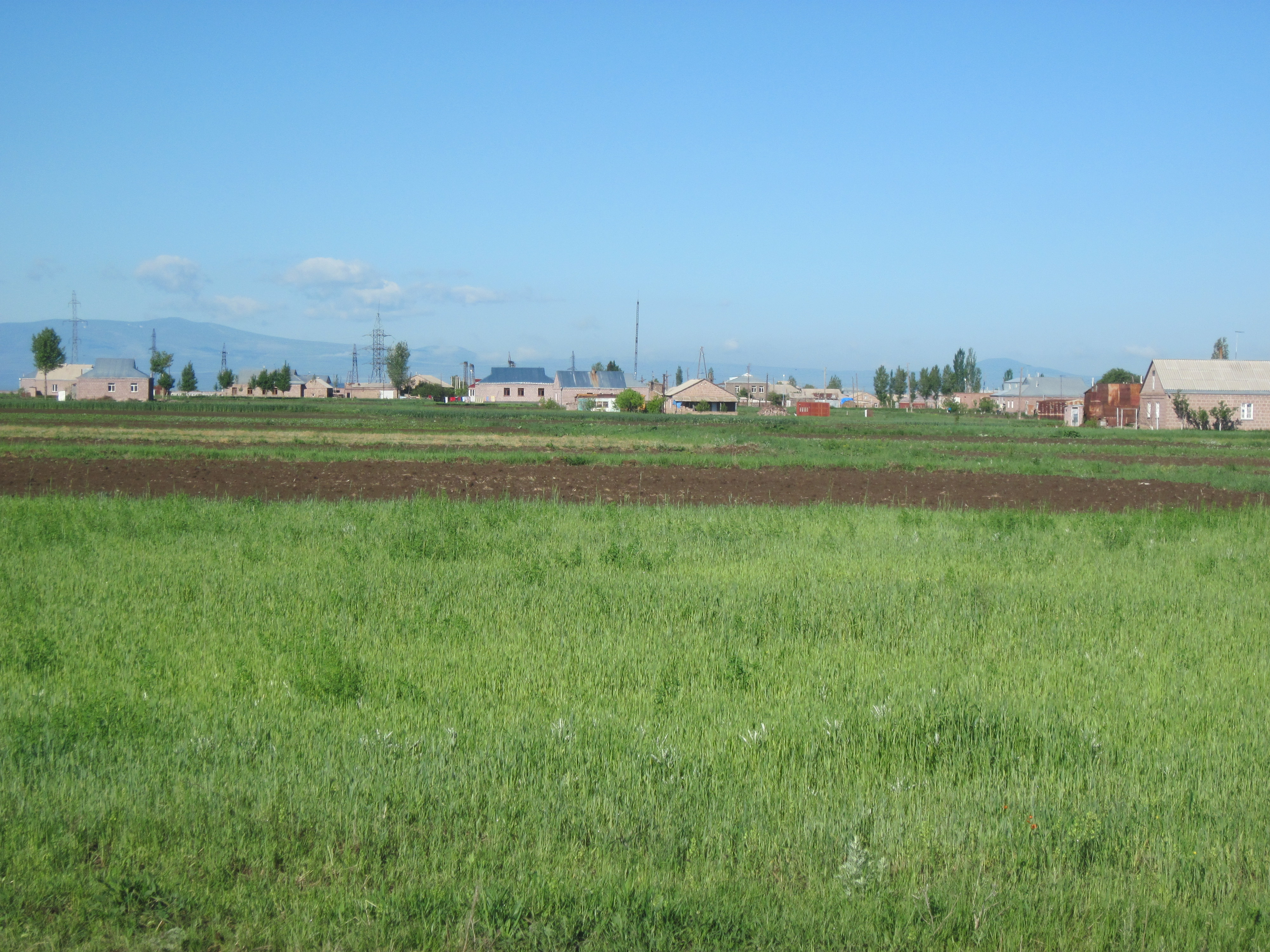
- Azatan

- Location within Armenia Location within Shirak
- Coordinates: 40°43′26″N 43°49′14″E
- Country: Armenia
- Province: Shirak
- Municipality: Akhuryan
- Elevation: 1,490 m (4,890 ft)

Population (2011)
  - Total: 4,838

Azatan (Armenian: Ազատան) is a village in the Akhuryan Municipality of the Shirak Province of Armenia. The Statistical Committee of Armenia reported its population was 4,838 at the 2011 census that was down from 5,697 at the 2010 estimate.

== Demographics ==
Historical population
Year	Pop.	±% p.a.
1831	1,450	—
1922	2,940	+0.78%
1959	3,039	+0.09%
1970	4,000	+2.53%
1979	3,956	−0.12%
1989	5,616	+3.57%
2001	5,117	−0.77%
2004	5,175	+0.38%
2011	4,838	−0.96%
