= Catholic Church in Georgia =

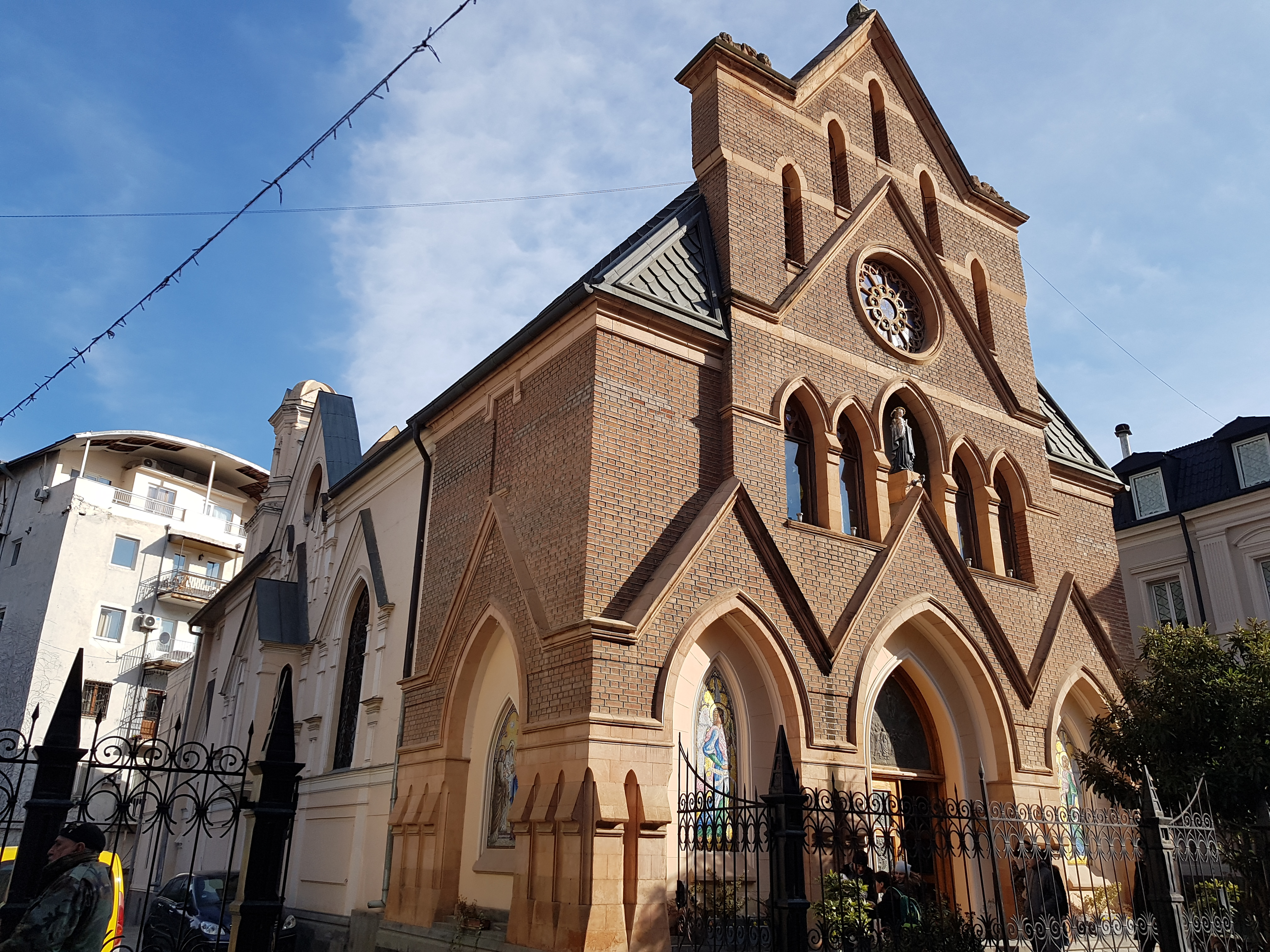
- Cathedral of the Assumption of the Virgin, Tbilisi
- Type: National polity
- Classification: Catholic
- Orientation: Latin and Eastern
- Theology: Catholic theology
- Polity: Episcopal
- Pope: Leo XIV
- Apostolic Nuncio: Ante Jozić
- Region: Georgia
- Language: Georgian, Latin, Armenian, English
- Members: 19,195 (2014)

The Coat of Arms of Catholic Church in Georgia

The Catholic Church in Georgia, since the 11th-century East–West Schism, has been composed mainly of Latin Church Catholics; a very large community of the Armenian Catholic Church has existed in Georgia since the 18th century.

A small Georgian Greek Catholic community has existed for a number of centuries, though has never constituted an autonomous sui iuris Church. This was never established as a recognized particular church of any level (exarchate, ordinariate, etc.), within the communion of Catholic Churches, and accordingly has never appeared in the list of Eastern Catholic Churches published in the Annuario Pontificio.

== History ==
=== Early relations with Rome ===
The religious connection of Georgia with Rome was established as soon as Christianity was proclaimed the state religion in the kingdom. Saint Nino and King Mirian III received a letter of blessing from Pope Sylvester I of Rome, which was brought to Mtskheta by a certain Frankish archdeacon.

The Historia Ecclesiastica of Tyrannius Rufinus contains important information about the early history of Christianity in Georgia.

Important ties with the Catholic Church did not cease in the centuries that followed, as evidenced by a letter sent by Catholicos Kirion I of Iberia (596–610) to the Pope, posing the doctrinal question: "Is it necessary to rebaptize repentant Nestorians?"

=== Middle Ages ===
During the Great Schism, the Georgian Orthodox Church took the side of Constantinople. However, relations between the Georgians and the Latins were not as strained as those between the Greeks and the Latins. In Georgian sources, the Latins are rarely portrayed negatively, and the schism was generally regarded as temporary.

After the Mongol invasions of Georgia in 1235, Queen Rusudan of Georgia appealed to the Holy See for military assistance, promising in return that the Georgian Orthodox Church would unite with the Catholic Church. The Pope was unable to help Georgia due to his strained relations with the Holy Roman Emperor Frederick II and the great distance between them. Nevertheless, in a lengthy reply, he praised the queen's decision to join the Holy See and, in order to strengthen relations, sent Catholic priests to Georgia.

In 1307, Pope Clement V sent numerous Franciscan and Dominican missionaries to Georgia. This effort was continued by the next Pope, John XXII. In 1318, a portion of the missionaries sent to Tbilisi returned to Rome and reported to the Pope that the spread of Catholicism in Georgia was progressing well, which encouraged him to raise the issue of unifying the Churches. In 1321, he wrote a letter to King George V of Georgia, urging him to unite with the Catholic Church:

I now beseech you and adjure you in the name of the Lord Jesus Christ not to delay your union with the Holy Church of Rome. And if you object that such a union is impossible without an ecumenical council, we also inform you that we are ready to convene such a council, if you and your bishops so require.

By a papal bull of 1329, the Pope of Rome, in response to pressure from the Turks, abolished the episcopal see in İzmir and chose the "famous and distinguished" city of Tbilisi as the seat of a new bishopric, where churches were built. The Dominican John of Florence was appointed bishop and remained in office until his death in 1348.

Despite the fact that, due to doctrinal differences, a union with the Catholic Church did not take place, the royal court of Georgia was well aware of the necessity of close ties with Europe, and Catholics were granted full freedom of activity, which led to the emergence of a Catholic community in Georgia.

=== Late Middle Ages ===
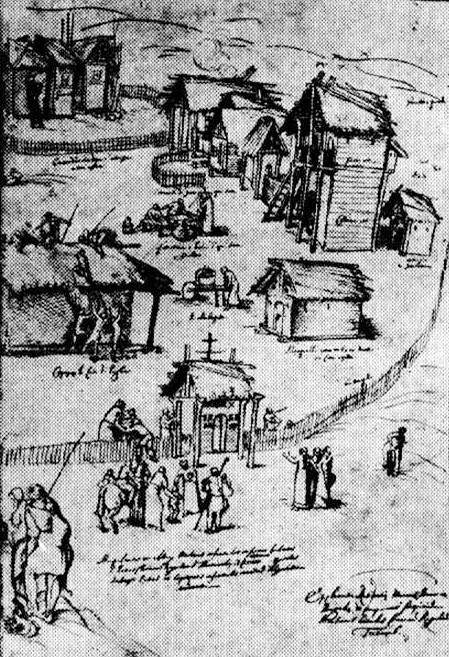
Catholic missions residence in Mingrelia. A sketch from the album of the contemporaneous Roman Catholic missionary Cristoforo Castelli.

In 1438, the representative of the Georgian Patriarch, Metropolitan Gregory of Tbilisi, took part in the Council of Ferrara-Florence. Gregory, together with Mark of Ephesus, the representative of the Orthodox Church of Alexandria, refused to accept the union.

In 1453, the Ottomans captured Constantinople. The issue of organizing an anti-Ottoman coalition became a pressing matter. For this purpose, in 1456, the Franciscan friar Ludovico da Bologna, a representative of Pope Callixtus III, came to Georgia from Europe and reported to the Pope that there was a large Catholic community in Georgia that strictly observed all established rules.

From the late 15th century onward, the Catholic community in Georgia began to decline. This was due to the strengthening of the Ottoman Empire and the fragmentation of the country into separate kingdoms and principalities following civil wars. The closure of trade routes further resulted in the interruption of the arrival of Catholic missionaries from Europe to the region.

=== Early modern period ===
In 1626, the Theatine and Capuchin orders established new missions in Georgia. In 1687, King George XI converted to Catholicism, and a section of the Orthodox clergy also acknowledged the authority of the Pope of Rome, as evidenced by the king's correspondence with Rome.

In 1692, Sulkhan-Saba Orbeliani, a Georgian writer and diplomat, converted to Catholicism. He initially practiced his new faith in secret. After 1703, he made the promotion of the Catholic faith in Georgia a key element of the policy of King Vakhtang VI, his former pupil. In 1713–1714, Orbeliani traveled to the Holy See and to France. He visited Pope Clement XI and Louis XIV, seeking assistance for King Vakhtang and for the Catholic cause in Kartli (the eastern Georgian kingdom). After returning to Kartli, Orbeliani actively sought to spread Catholicism in Georgia, for which he was persecuted by the Georgian Orthodox Church.

From the 1770s onward, Heraclius II, who sought closer political and military ties with Russia, restricted the spread of Catholicism in his kingdom. He issued a decree stipulating that conversion to Catholicism would be punishable by two months' imprisonment.

=== Russian Empire period ===
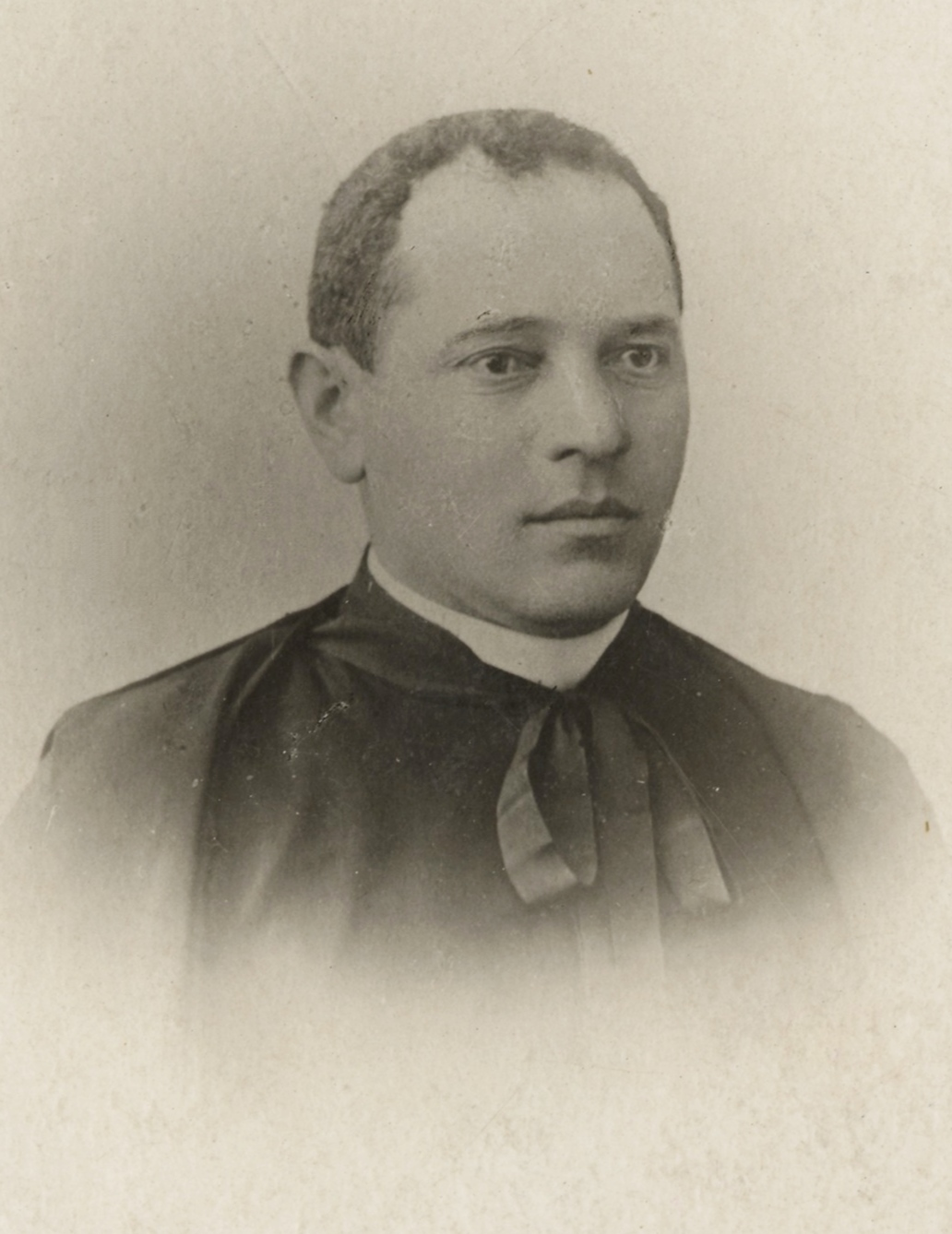
Michel Tamarati, Georgian Catholic priest and historian

After Georgia became part of the Russian Empire, the situation of Catholics remained difficult. However, an agreement between Pope Pius IX and Tsar Nicholas I in 1848 permitted the establishment of the Latin Diocese of Tiraspol. It was based in Russia, but all Transcaucasian Catholics, including ethnic Georgians, were assigned to it. The Russian part of that diocese is now called the Saint Clement in Saratov.

According to the French diplomat and traveler Jean François Gamba, by the 1820s there were 44 local Catholic families in Kutaisi, numbering approximately 300 individuals. According to another account, by the 1830s there were 92 Catholic families in Tbilisi, 30 in Kutaisi, and 450 in Akhaltsikhe. According to the 1897 census of the Russian Empire, Kutaisi had 1,545 Catholics, while the city's total population amounted to 32,476.

Towards the end of the 19th century, some Georgian Catholics wished to use the Byzantine Rite in Old Georgian, but were thwarted by the outlawing of Byzantine "Uniate" groups. Accordingly, since the tsars forbade their Catholic subjects to use the Byzantine Rite after the Synod of Polotsk of 1839 –and the Holy See did not promote its use among the Georgians–some clergy and laity adopted the Armenian Rite.

At Istanbul in 1861, ethnic Georgian and former Mekhitarist priest Fr. Peter Kharischirashvili founded the first two religious congregations of the Georgian Greek Catholic Church; the Servites of the Immaculate Conception, one for men and the other for women. They served Georgian Catholics living in the Ottoman Empire and elsewhere in the Georgian diaspora, like at Montaubon, France. Both congregations survived until the late 1950s. The building that housed the male congregation of the Servites, Fery-Quoa, still stands in Istanbul, but is now in private ownership. Their clergy gave Georgian Catholics in Constantinople the possibility to worship in the Byzantine Rite in Old Georgian, but, as is common for Eastern Catholics without a Hierarchy of their own, they were under the authority of the local Latin Catholic bishop.

=== Modern period ===
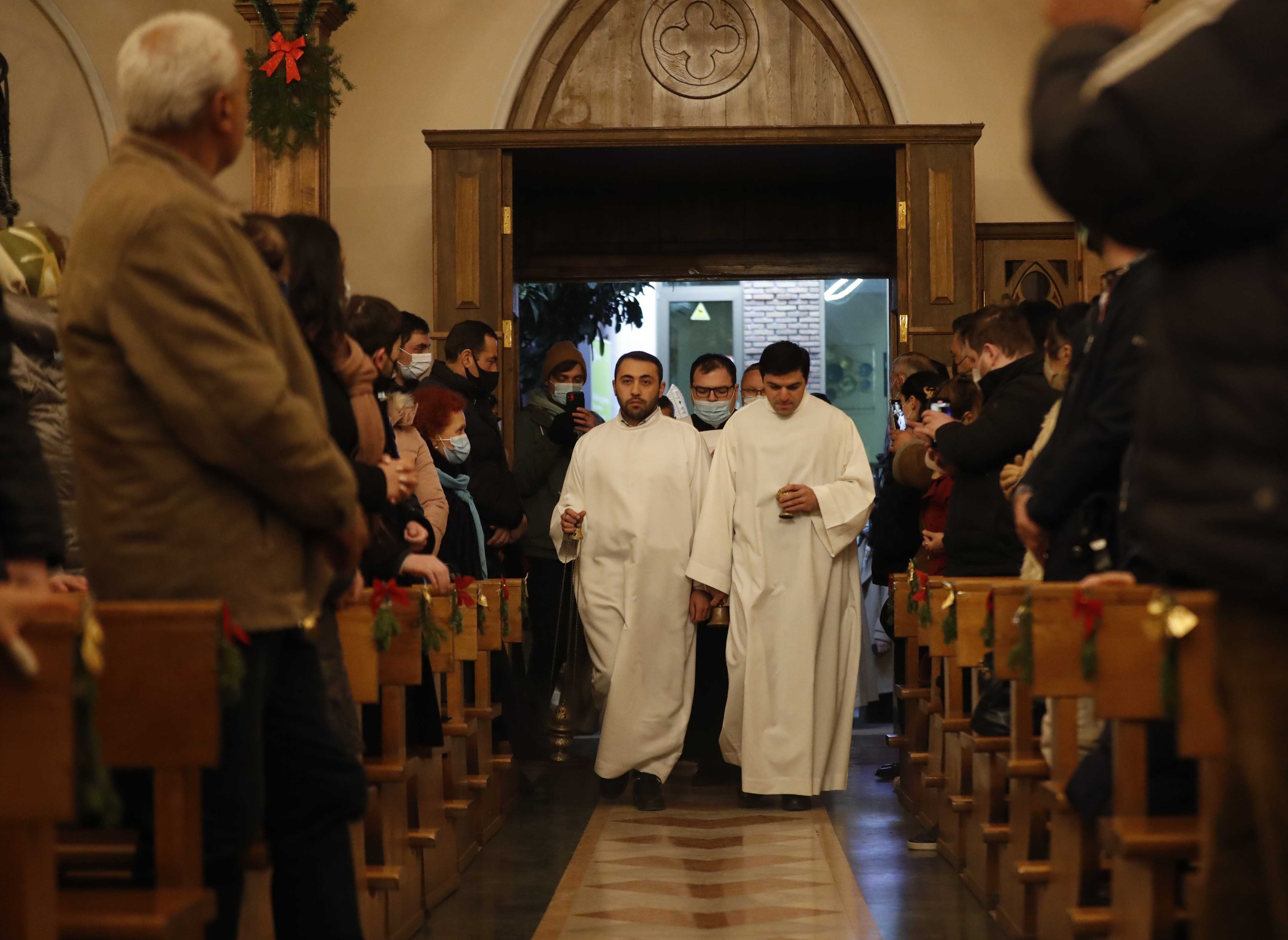
Catholic Christmas mass in Tbilisi

The Georgian nationalist, Catholic priest, and political émigré Fr Michel Tamarati was the first to study the history of Catholicism in Georgia, eventually producing the oft-cited L'Église géorgienne des origines jusqu'à nos jours in French in 1911.

Only after the granting of religious freedom during the Russian Revolution of 1905 did some Georgian Catholics resume the Byzantine Rite, without reaching the stage of establishing a particular church for them.

At the outbreak of the First World War, Georgian Catholics numbered about 50,000. About 40,000 of these were Latin Rite Catholics, while the remainder were mainly Armenian Catholics. Canonically, they were under the Latin Diocese of Tiraspol, headquartered in Saratov on the Volga River.

In the brief period of Georgian independence between 1918 and 1921, some influential Georgian Orthodox figures expressed interest in reunification with the Holy See, and a Vatican envoy was sent in 1919 to examine the situation. However, due to the onset of the Russian Civil War and the Soviet invasion of Georgia, this initiative came to nothing.

In 1920, it was estimated that of 40,000 Catholics in Georgia, 32,000 were Latin Rite Catholics and the remainder were Armenian Catholics.

According to Fr Christopher Zugger, nine Servite missionaries from Constantinople, led by Exarch Shio Batmanishvili, came to the newly independent Democratic Republic of Georgia to establish Byzantine Rite Catholicism in Old Georgian, and by 1929 their community had grown to 8,000. Their mission ended with the arrest of Shio and his priests by the Soviet secret police in 1928, their imprisonment in the Solovki prison camp, and their subsequent execution by the NKVD at Sandarmokh in 1937.

From the 1980s onward, Catholic activity in Georgia became more prominent, and local believers began restoring and renovating closed or ruined churches.

In June 1989, Mother Teresa visited Tbilisi, where she attended a liturgical service at Sioni Cathedral. During the visit, the Catholicos-Patriarch of All Georgia, Ilia II, awarded her an ecclesiastical order. While in Tbilisi, Mother Teresa also established a mission of her charitable congregation.

On 8 November 1999, Pope John Paul II visited Georgia, including the capital Tbilisi. The visit was conducted at a high level and marked by large public attendance. At Svetitskhoveli Cathedral, Pope John Paul II and Patriarch Ilia II signed a joint peace appeal addressed to the world's religious leaders. Later that evening, the Pope visited the Church of St. Peter and St. Paul's Church, Tbilisi.

From 30 September to 2 October 2016, Pope Francis visited Georgia. During the visit, he met with the then-President of Georgia, Giorgi Margvelashvili, and with Catholicos-Patriarch Ilia II.

== Organisation ==
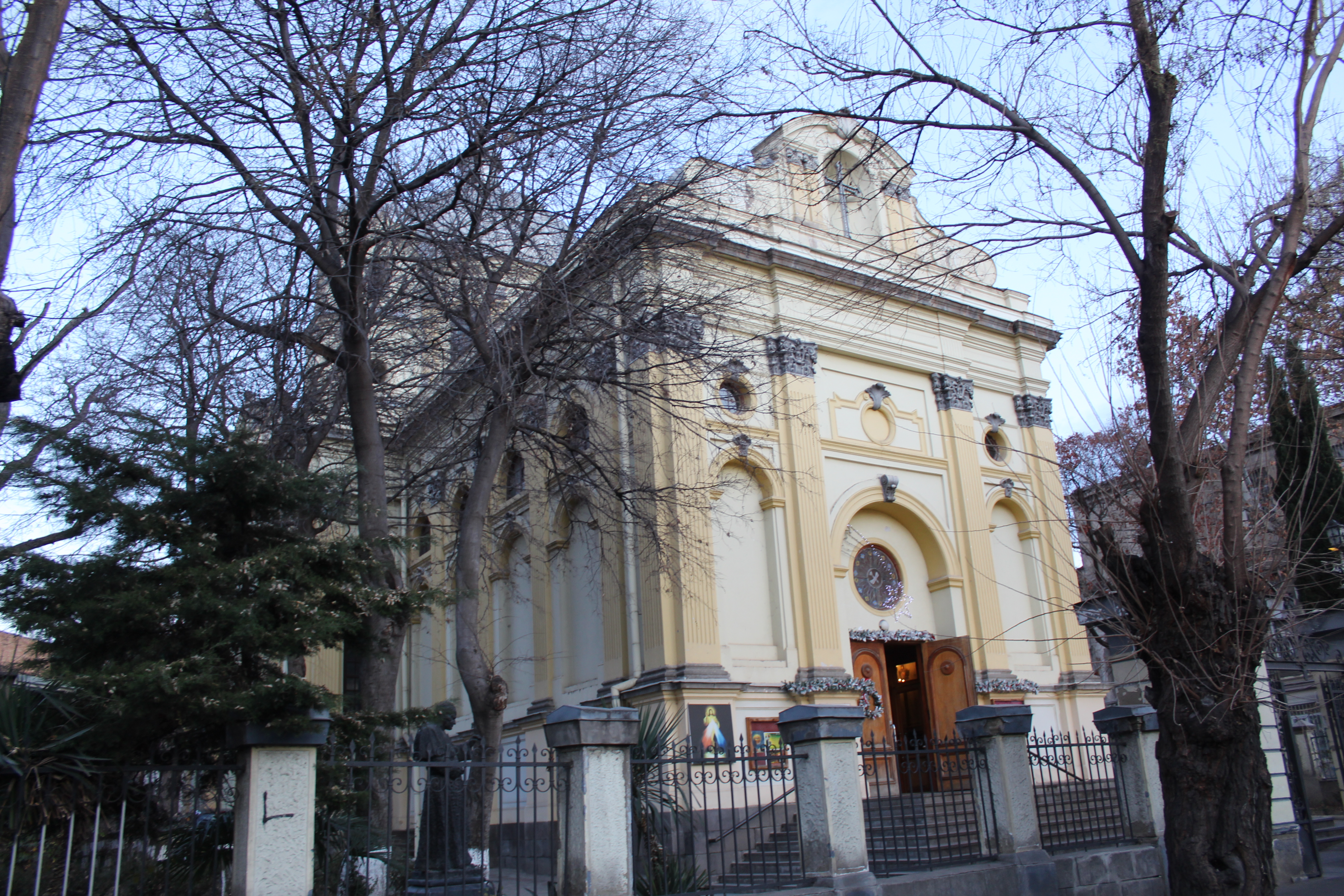
St. Peter and St. Paul's Church, Tbilisi.

After the collapse of the Soviet Union, a Latin apostolic administration (pre-diocesan jurisdiction) of the Caucasus was established on 30 December 1993, with headquarters in the Georgian capital Tbilisi, with a territory including Georgia, Armenia and, until 2001, Azerbaijan. Since 1996 this has been headed by bishop Giuseppe Pasotto, who arrived in Tbilisi in 1993 and has lived in Georgia ever since. In an interview with Aid to the Church in Need, the bishop described the situation of the Catholic Church on his arrival, soon after the country had gained independence. "The only thing that was left of the Catholic Church was one open place of worship (the Church of St. Peter and St. Paul in Tbilisi). The communities that were scattered across rural areas had all been abandoned. The first thing we did was re-establish contact and then find additional priests from other countries and local churches to come and help us. And so we gradually began to rebuild the most important structures. It seems to me that the rosary saved the Catholic faith not only in Georgia, but in all Communist countries. The people came together in the houses to pray and the grandmothers were the ones who took responsibility."

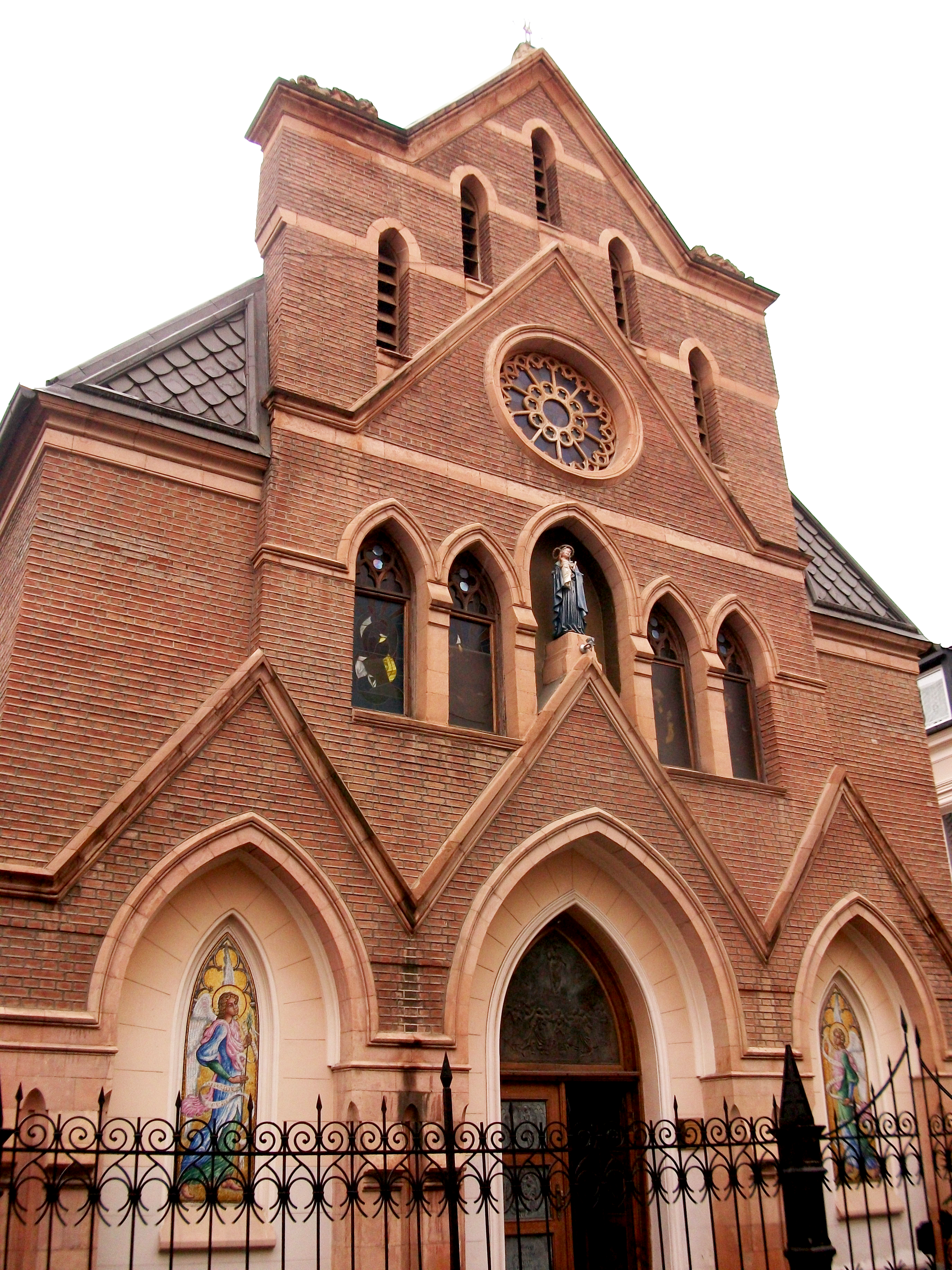
Cathedral of the Assumption of the Virgin, Tbilisi.

In the same interview, the bishop ranked ecumenical work as the main priority for the Church at present. "This is our first task and it is a very difficult one. Due to the legacy of its past, the Orthodox Church still has a hard time being open to this. The Catholics are well aware that they are a minority and often face discrimination and unfair treatment. You just need to remember the six churches that were confiscated and never given back, or the prohibition of interfaith marriages. The ecumenical path requires a great deal of patience and the constant search for new and potential opportunities for establishing relationships that could develop into bridges. Our university, where most of the students are non-Catholics, plays an important role in this."

Armenian Catholic Georgians are in the care of the Ordinariate for Catholics of Armenian Rite in Eastern Europe, which was established on 13 July 1991, covering a vast area including Russia and Ukraine, much vaster than Georgia, which has some 400,000 faithful in all (Annuario Pontificio 2012).

Georgian Catholics of the Byzantine rite are said to have numbered 7,000 in 2005.

Theatine and Capuchin missionaries worked for reunion in Georgia, but under Imperial Russia in 1845, Catholics were not allowed to use the Byzantine Rite. Many Catholics adopted the Armenian Rite until the institution of religious liberty in 1905, which allowed them to return to the Byzantine Rite. In 1937, the Georgian Catholic exarch, Shio Batmanishvili (or Batmalishviii), was executed by the Soviets.

== Demographics and major churches ==
They are mostly found either in Tbilisi or in the southern region of the country, where exclusively Catholic villages exist. There are three Catholic churches in Tbilisi: the Cathedral of the Assumption of the Virgin in the old town, St. Peter and St. Paul's Church on Ivane Javakhishvili Street, and the Mar Shemmon Bar Sabbae Assyrian Chaldean Catholic Church in Saburtalo. A Neocatechumenal Way mission involving priests, families in mission and lay persons has been present in St. Peter and St. Paul's Church since 1991, helping and leading the parish.

The Catholics in Tbilisi are mostly Georgians and Armenians, as well as a small Assyrian community of the Chaldean Rite.

This church also provides mass in English, catering for the growing Catholic expatriate population of Americans, Europeans, Indians and Maltese. There are only about 1000 practicing Catholics in Tbilisi. Many other Catholic churches were confiscated by the Georgian Orthodox Church after the fall of communism when the state gave all church property back to the Georgian Orthodox church. Recently, a new seminary has been completed on the outskirts of Tbilisi.

A Catholic church is also present in Sukhumi, in Abkhazia. Other Catholic Churches are found in Vale, Akhaltsikhe, Gori and in Batumi.

Caritas Georgia is the formal charitable organisation of the Catholic Church in Georgia.

== Notable Georgian Catholics ==
- Alois Mizandary – pianist and composer
- Demetrius of Tiflis – martyr
- George XI – king of Kartli
- Vakhtang VI – king of Kartli
- Michel Tamarati – Catholic priest and historian
- Petre Melikishvili – chemist
- Petre Otskheli – painter and stage designer
- Peter Kharischirashvili – Catholic priest
- Shio Batmanishvili – Catholic priest
- Simon Kaukhchishvili – historian and philologist
- Sulkhan-Saba Orbeliani – writer and diplomat
- Vano Merabishvili – former Prime Minister of Georgia
- Vano Sarajishvili – operatic tenor
- Zacharia Paliashvili – composer

== See also ==
- Religion in Georgia (country)
- Christianity in Georgia (country)
- Freedom of religion in Georgia (country)
- List of Catholic dioceses in Georgia
- Notre-Dame-de-Lourdes Georgian Catholic church in Bomonti, Şişli, Istanbul
- Georgian Byzantine-Rite Catholics
