= List of Catholic dioceses in Transcaucasia =

The Catholic Church in the (Trans)Caucasian former Soviet republics Armenia, Azerbaijan and Georgia consists solely of pre-diocesan Latin (missionary) and Eastern Catholic jurisdictions, which are all exempt, i.e. directly dependent on the Holy See (and its Roman Congregation for the Evangelization of Peoples for the Latin missions or its Roman Congregation for the Oriental Churches for the Eastern Catholics, notably Armenian), without any ecclesiastical province or (national) episcopal conference, all but one (in Azerbaijan) transnational :

- Two Latin, pre-diocesan :
  - an apostolic administration
  - an apostolic prefecture
- One Eastern Catholic : an Armenian Catholic Ordinariate for Eastern Catholic faithful.

There are also an Apostolic Nunciature (embassy-level) to Azerbaijan, an Apostolic Nunciature to Armenia and an Apostolic Nunciature to Georgia (in national capital Tbilisi, into which both other are vested), as papal diplomatic representation.

== Current jurisdictions ==
=== Current Latin ===
- Apostolic Administration of the Caucasus, for Georgia (see in national capital Tbilisi) and Armenia
- Apostolic Prefecture of Baku, for Azerbaijan

=== Current Eastern Catholic : Armenian Catholic church ===
(Armenian rite in Armenian language)

- Ordinariate for Armenian Catholics in Eastern Europe covering Armenia and Georgia, as well as Russia and Ukraine (all former USSR)

== Defunct jurisdictions ==
=== Titular sees ===
Only in Georgia :

- One Metropolitan Titular archbishoprics : Phasis (Poti)
- Two Archiepiscopal Titular archbishoprics : Sebastopolis in Abasgia, Soteropolis
- Five Episcopal Titular bishoprics : Petra in Lazica, Rhodopolis (Vartsikhe), Sæsina, Tiflis (modern capital as Tbilisi), Zygana

=== Other ===
(excluding mere predecessors of present jurisdictions)

- Roman Catholic Archdiocese of Nakhchivan (Nachitschewan) covered present Armenia and Azerbaijan

== See also ==
- List of Catholic dioceses (structured view)
- Catholicism in Armenia
- Catholicism in Azerbaijan
- Catholicism in Georgia

== Sources and external links ==
- GCatholic - Armenia
- GCatholic - Azerbaijan
- GCatholic - Georgia
