= Sisters of the Immaculate Conception =

Sisters of the Immaculate Conception may refer to:

- Sisters of Providence of the Immaculate Conception, see appropriate section in Congregation of the Immaculate Conception
- Sisters of the Immaculate Conception (France), see appropriate section in Congregation of the Immaculate Conception
- Sisters of the Immaculate Conception (Louisiana), see appropriate section in Congregation of the Immaculate Conception
- Sisters of the Immaculate Conception (originally Spain), see appropriate section in Congregation of the Immaculate Conception
- Sisters of the Immaculate Conception of the Blessed Virgin Mary, founded in Lithuania
- Armenian Sisters of the Immaculate Conception
- For information on the Congregation of the Sisters of the Immaculate Conception of the Blessed Virgin Mary in Poland, Belarus, and Ukraine, see Marcelina Darowska, who was the founder.
