= Georgian church =

Georgian church may refer to:

- Georgian Orthodox Church
- Catholic Church in Georgia
- Georgian Byzantine-Rite Catholics
