= Congregation of the Immaculate Conception =

Roman Catholic monastic communities

There are a number of Roman Catholic religious orders or congregations with Immaculate Conception in their name. Several of them are discussed here.

== Missionary Sisters of the Immaculate Conception of the Mother of God ==
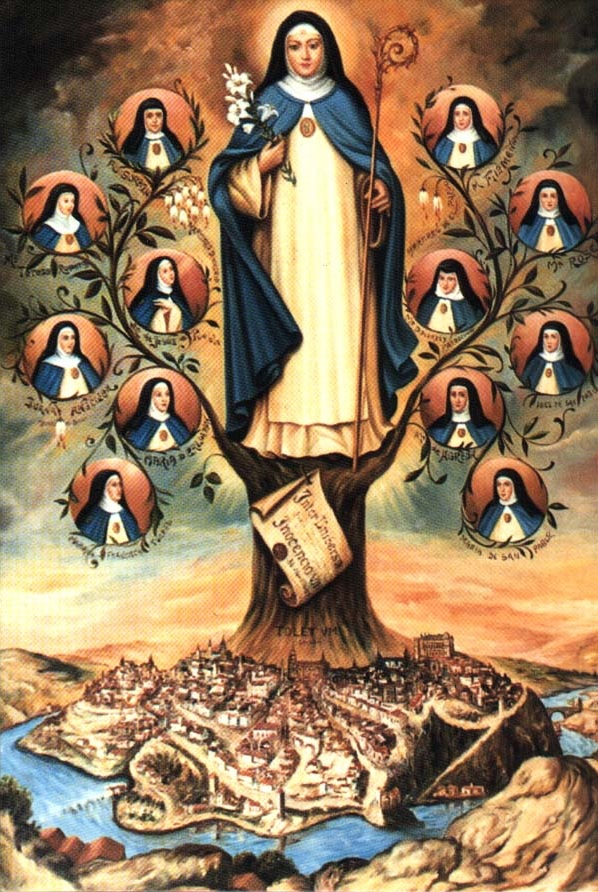
The Order of the Immaculate Conception was founded by Beatrice of Silva.

The Missionary Sisters of the Immaculate Conception of the Mother of God (abbreviated SMIC) are an institute of religious sisters in the Roman Catholic Church. The congregation belongs to the Third Order Regular of St. Francis. They were founded in 1910 in Santarém, Brazil, by Armand August Bahlmann, OFM, and Mother Immaculata (born Elizabeth Tombrock), both natives of Germany, to educate the children of the poor throughout the world.

== Order of the Immaculate Conception of Our Lady ==
The Order of the Immaculate Conception of Our Lady, otherwise known as the "Conceptionists", was founded in 1484 at Toledo, Spain, by Beatrice of Silva, sister of Blessed Amadeus of Portugal. The foundress determined on the habit, which was white, with a white scapular and blue mantle.

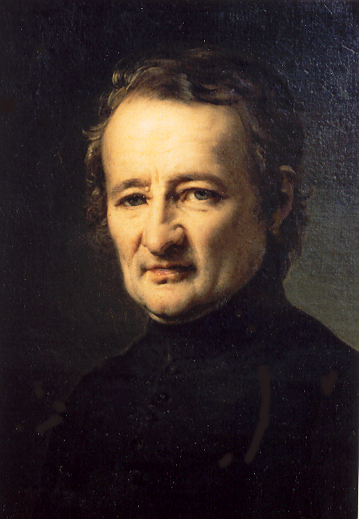
Jean-Marie de La Mennais, 1827

== Mission Priests of the Immaculate Conception ==
The Mission Priests of the Immaculate Conception, also known as the Missionaries of Rennes, was founded at St-Méen in the Diocese of Rennes, by Jean-Marie-Robert de Lamennais, for the care of the diocesan seminary and the holding of missions. It subsequently united with the Society of St. Peter, established by his younger brother, Félicité de Lamennais, in 1829 at La Chênaie, forming the Congrégation de Saint-Pierre.

== Servites of the Immaculate Conception ==
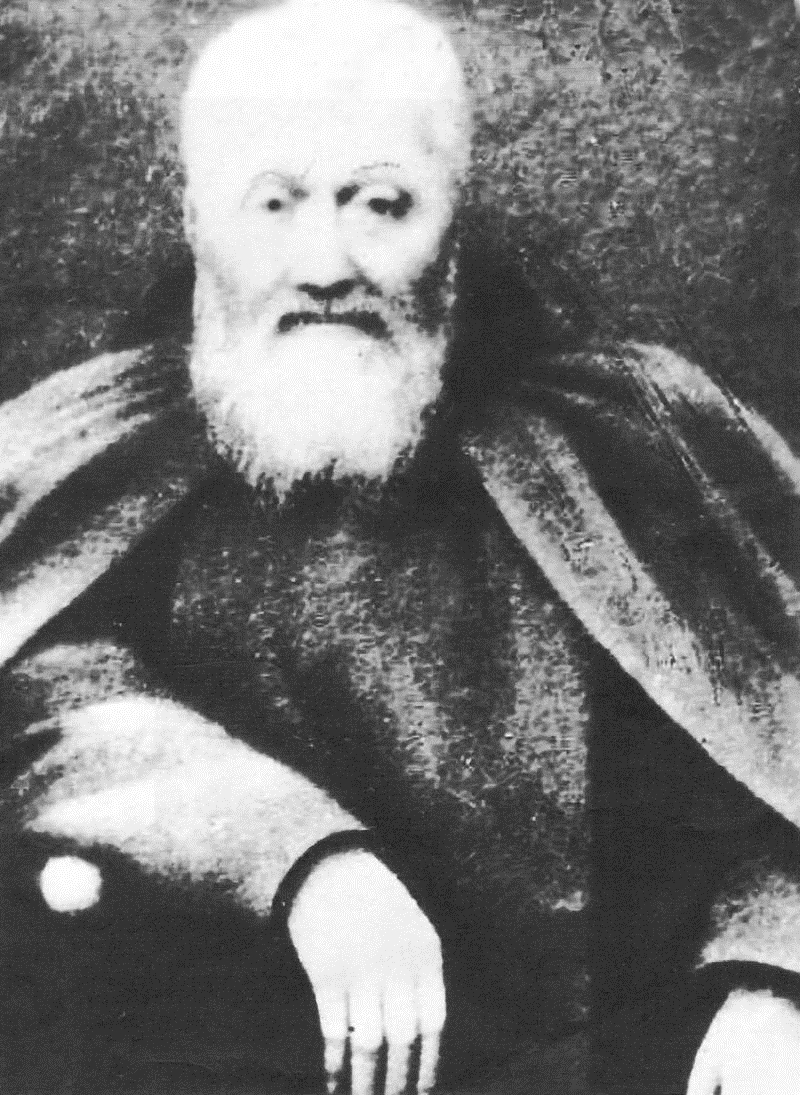
Peter Kharischirashvili, a Georgian priest

The Servites of the Immaculate Conception were founded at Constantinople in 1864 by Peter Kharischirashvili, a Georgian Hieromonk formerly of the Mekhitarist Congregation in San Lazzaro Island, to minister to the spiritual wants of the Georgian people. The congregation was confirmed by Pius IX, 29 May 1875. Approval was given for the use of three rites, Roman Rite, Armenian Rite, and the Byzantine Rite in the traditional Old Georgian liturgical language. The first two were for use among the Georgians in their native country, the last to keep up the Greek-Georgian Rite in the monastery at Constantinople, which was the mother-house of the congregation.

The priests of the Immaculate Conception got charge of three congregations at Constantinople, one at Feri-kuei, for Georgians and Armenians, another for the Latins at Scutari, and a third for Georgian Greek Catholics at Pera.

Candidates for the priesthood were ordained in Saratov by the Bishop of Tiraspol, who was the ecclesiastical superior of the Catholic Church in Georgia; for a time they filled parish duties as secular priests, after which they were appointed by the congregation to a post where they might minister to their countrymen.

The Sister Servites of the Immaculate Conception conducted two primary schools, to which children are admitted, without distinction of creed.

According to Father Christopher Zugger, nine Servite missionaries from Constantinople, headed by Exarch Shio Batmanishvili, came to the Democratic Republic of Georgia to permanently establish the Byzantine Rite in Old Georgian there, and by 1929 their faithful had grown to 8,000. Tragically, their mission came to an end with the arrests of Exarch Shio and his priests by the Soviet secret police in 1928, their imprisonment in the Gulag at Solovki prison camp, and their subsequent murder by Joseph Stalin's NKVD at Sandarmokh in 1937.

== Missionary Sisters of the Immaculate Conception ==
The Missionary Sisters of the Immaculate Conception are members of a religious congregation of women dedicated to serve in the nations of the world most in need. Founded in 1902 by Délia Tétreault (1865-1941) in Canada, they were the first such institute established in North America. Members of the congregation use the postnominal initials of M.I.C.

== Sisters of Providence of the Immaculate Conception ==
Founded at Jodoigne, in 1833, definitively established at Champion near Namur (also in Belgium) in 1836, by Canon Jean-Baptiste-Victor Kinet, for the instruction of children, the care of orphan asylums and the service of the sick and prisoners.

In 1858 the congregation received the approbation of the Apostolic See, and shortly afterwards the confirmation of its statutes. By 1876 there were 150 convents in Belgium, England, Italy and the United States. The mother-house is at Champion.

== Sisters of the Immaculate Conception (France) ==
A branch of the Association of the Holy Family of Bordeaux, founded in France in 1820 by Pierre-Bienvenu Noailles, a canon of that city, who conceived the idea of founding a congregation to allow the expression of the Christian life in various forms. In 1820 he placed the first three members of the Holy Family in a house at Bordeaux, under the name of the Ladies of Loreto. As the numbers increased the sisters were divided by their founder into two categories: (1) Those engaged directly in the various works undertaken by the Institute; (2) Lay sisters who perform household duties, and are called the Sisters of St. Martha. These are sub-divided into three branches: (a) The Sisters of St. Joseph who undertake the charge of orphans; (b) The Sisters of the Immaculate Conception, who devote themselves to educational work; (c) The Sisters of Hope, who nurse the sick. The Institute encountered much opposition at first, but the constitutions have now been canonically approved by the Holy See. The works of the Sisters of the Immaculate Conception are numerous; they devote themselves to educational work and visiting the poor.

In the early 20th century they had 15 convents in Great Britain and Ireland, to all of which and to five boarding-schools elementary schools are attached. About 230 sisters taught in these convents, the English novitiate being at Rock Ferry, Cheshire, the other English houses: at Great Prescot Street, London, E.; Leeds; Sicklinghall, Yorkshire; Stockport; Macclesfield; Stalybridge; Woodford, Essex; Ramsgate; Liscard, Cheshire; Birkenhead; also in Wrexham, Wales; and in Leith, Scotland. Attached to the Leeds convent is a juniorate for testing vocations.

The habit in England only is blue with a white girdle and a black veil.

== Sisters of the Immaculate Conception (Louisiana) ==
Twenty years after Pope Pius IX's Apostolic Constitution, Ineffabilis Deus, the Archdiocese of New Orleans's second indigenous religious congregation of women was founded, as the Sisters of the Immaculate Conception. They were founded in Labadieville, Louisiana, by the French-born Reverend Cyprien Venissat and Miss Adelaide Elvina Vienne. A former school-teacher, she took the veil (as Mother Mary of the Immaculate Conception, CIC) from the Most Reverend Napoléon-Joseph Perché, on 11 July 1874, which the Order regarded as their Founding Day. Mother Mary died in 1885, at the age of 48.

Their habit consisted of a black tunic and a blue scapular in honor of the Virgin Mary.

The Community was a teaching order among the young in the State of Louisiana. Following the Second Vatican Council, however, the order's ranks dwindled (as with so many other communities) and on 14 July 2026, the last living member, Sister Jerome, died at the age of ninety-one.

The former Immaculate Conception Convent, 3037 Dauphine Street, New Orleans, in 2009.

In the 2007 film, The Church on Dauphine Street (by Ann Hedreen and Rustin Thompson), their former mother-house, the Immaculate Conception Convent, is featured. Built in 1932, it is now the St Gerard Majella Center and Archdiocesan Deaf Ministry. The film traces its restoration following the catastrophic Hurricane Katrina.

== Missionary Sisters of the Immaculate Conception of Mary (originally from Spain) ==
The order "Missionary Sisters of the Immaculate Conception of Mary" (RCM, Concepcionistas Misioneras de la Enseñanza) was founded in 1892 in Burgos, Spain by sister St. Carmen Sallés y Barangueras along with three other sisters. The sisters opened schools in several parts of Spain. Later sites in Brazil and in other countries in the world were established. The Sisters of the Immaculate Conception founded by Carmen Sallés work in the following countries: Spain, Brazil, Venezuela, Japan, United States (California), Dominican Republic, Equatorial Guinea, Democratic Republic of Congo, Italy, Philippines, Korea, Mexico, India, Republic of Congo, Indonesia and Haiti.

== See also ==
- Sisters of the Immaculate Conception of the Blessed Virgin Mary, founded in Lithuania, convent in Connecticut
- Armenian Sisters of the Immaculate Conception
- Confraternity of the Immaculate Conception, the Servers' Guild of the Manila Cathedral
- Congregation of Marian Fathers of the Immaculate Conception

== Bibliography ==
Bibliography to the Louisiana Order

- The Catholic Church in Louisiana, by Roger Baudier, New Orleans, 1939.
- Guide to the Catholic Sisterhoods in the United States, edited by Thomas P. McCarthy, CSV, The Catholic University of America Press, 1964. ISBN 0-8132-1312-6
- Spicing Ecclesiastical Gumbo: The Life of Napoléon-Joseph Perché, by William Lemuel Greene, Claitor's Publishing Division, 2012. ISBN 1-59804-636-5
- Blessed Francis Seelos Xavier Seelos Church: Celebrating 150 Years of the Former St Vincent de Paul Church, by the Very Reverend José I. Lavastida Mata, Blessed Francis Xavier Seelos Parish, 2015.
