= Giuseppe Pasotto =

Italian Catholic bishop in the Caucasus

Giuseppe Pasotto C.S.S.
- Apostolic Administrator of the Caucasus
- Church: Catholic Church
- See: Apostolic Administration of the Caucasus
- Appointed: 29 November 1996
- Predecessor: Jean-Paul Gobel
- Other post: Titular Bishop of Musti (since 1999)

Orders
- Ordination: 12 May 1979 by Lucas Moreira Neves
- Consecration: 6 January 2000 by Pope John Paul II

Personal details
- Born: 6 July 1954 (age 72) Bovolone, Veneto, Italy

Giuseppe Pasotto (Bovolone, Italy, 6 July 1954) is an Italian Catholic bishop. Since 1996 he is the Latin Church bishop of the Apostolic Administration of the Caucasus, covering the functions of a bishop for the Catholic communities in Georgia and Armenia.

== Biography ==
Born in Bovolone, in the Province of Verona, still a young man Pasotto entered in the seminary of the Congregation of the Sacred Stigmata of Our Lord Jesus Christ (Stigmatines) and was ordained a priest on 12 May 1979 by Cardinal Lucas Moreira Neves. In 1993, he went to Georgia, following a request by the Congregation of the Holy See of the Catholic presence in the Latin Church in the country (made possible by the dissolution of the USSR). In 1996 he was appointed Apostolic Administrator of the Caucasus of the Latins, exercising a pastoral role equivalent to that of bishop for Latin Catholics of Georgia, Armenia and Azerbaijan. Pasotto was appointed Titular Bishop of Musti by Pope John Paul II, from which he was ordained on 6 January 2000 in St. Peter's Basilica. In 2005 he convened the first diocesan synod Apostolic Administration of the Caucasus. In 2008, during the Russia-Georgia war between Russia and Georgia, Pasotto denounced that "the people's fear is to be left alone in front of the Russian giant, and that Westerners only know how to speak well". Under his administration, the Catholic Church in Tbilisi opened its doors to refugees from the affected areas. According to the bishop, the Catholic Church was the first to get humanitarian aid through to Gori, having delivered it to the Orthodox bishop, to be distributed.

== Ministry in Georgia ==
Giuseppe Pasotto arrived in Georgia soon after the country had gained independence, in 1993. He describes an atmosphere of great poverty, but also of hope and an appreciation for freedom. "I came here together with another priest from my small community of Stigmatines, which was founded in Verona. At the time, we experienced the same hardships as the people living here – particularly the cold and the deprivation. This helped us to love these people even more and to understand the meaning of freedom. Our conversations with young people taught us the importance of suffering for fundamental values and keeping hope alive."

After 70 years of Communism, the Catholic Church was unorganised and most communities no longer existed. What little remained of the Catholic faith was kept alive in private homes, mostly by matriarchs. "The only thing that was left of the Catholic Church was one open place of worship (the Church of St. Peter and St. Paul in Tbilisi). The communities that were scattered across rural areas had all been abandoned. The first thing we did was re-establish contact and then find additional priests from other countries and local churches to come and help us. And so we gradually began to rebuild the most important structures. It seems to me that the rosary saved the Catholic faith not only in Georgia, but in all Communist countries. The people came together in the houses to pray and the grandmothers were the ones who took responsibility."

In an interview with Aid to the Church in Need, in 2022, the bishop ranked ecumenical work as the main priority for the Church at present. "This is our first task and it is a very difficult one. Due to the legacy of its past, the Orthodox Church still has a hard time being open to this. The Catholics are well aware that they are a minority and often face discrimination and unfair treatment. You just need to remember the six churches that were confiscated and never given back, or the prohibition of interfaith marriages. The ecumenical path requires a great deal of patience and the constant search for new and potential opportunities for establishing relationships that could develop into bridges. Our university, where most of the students are non-Catholics, plays an important role in this."

Bishop Giuseppe Pasotto was the president of Caritas Georgia for a number of years.
