= Carmen Salles y Barangueras =

Spanish Roman Catholic professed religious

Saint Carmen Sallés y Barangueras RCM
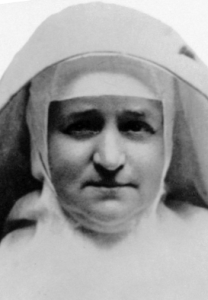

Virgin
- Born: 9 April 1848; Vic, Barcelona, Kingdom of Spain
- Died: 25 July 1911 (aged 63); Madrid, Kingdom of Spain
- Venerated in: Roman Catholic Church
- Beatified: 15 March 1998, Saint Peter's Square, Vatican City by Pope John Paul II
- Canonized: 21 October 2012, Saint Peter's Square, Vatican City by Pope Benedict XVI
- Feast: 6 December

María del Carmen Sallés y Barangueras (9 April 1848 – 25 July 1911), religious name Carmen of Jesus, was a Spanish religious sister. She founded the Missionary Sisters of the Immaculate Conception. Sallés is best known for being a strong advocate of both genders being equal and a staunch defender of the rights of women, since she made this the focus of her life from the beginning of her entrance into religious life. She was beatified on 15 March 1998 and was canonized on 21 October 2012 in Saint Peter's Square.

== Life ==
Carmen Sallés y Barangueras was born in Vic, Spain on 9 April 1848 as the second of ten children to José Sallés y Vall and Francisca Barangueras y del Planell. The family later moved to Manresa.

In 1858 she traveled to Montserrat on a pilgrimage together with her parents and it was during this trip that she decided to devote her life to God, which was augmented following the reception of her First Communion. Later in 1864 she announced her desire to become a religious sister and managed to convince her parents to break off an arranged marriage to which Carmen had been committed. It was not long after this that she fulfilled that goal and began her path of service when she joined the Sister Adorers of the Blessed Sacrament while breaking a marriage betrothal in the process and she started her novitiate in Barcelona on 7 May 1869.

Her work for the following two decades focused on helping with the rehabilitation of women who had fallen victim to lives of prostitution or other crimes. In May 1871, she decided to join the Dominican Sisters of the Annunciation of the Blessed Virgin. Sallés made her perpetual vows in August 1872. Salles ran a little school so that the children of working women were not on the streets.

After a visit to the chapel of the Virgin of Good Counsel, located in the Collegiate Church of San Isidro in Madrid, Sallés decided on her next course of action. She left the congregation with three others and on 15 October 1892, arrived in Burgos. The Missionary Sisters of the Immaculate Conception in Burgos was founded on 22 February 1892. This congregation focused on influencing societal norms in a positive manner and educating girls in order to prevent them from turning to prostitution and other forms of moral degradation. Her institute trained young women to be teachers. The order received diocesan approval on 7 December 1892. It received the decree of praise from Pope Pius X on 19 September 1908 and papal approval in full from Pope Pius XII on 7 December 1954. It has existed in nations such as the United States since 1962 and China since 1981. As of 2006, there were 519 nuns in 66 houses. Sallés died in 1911 in Madrid.

== Beatification and canonisation ==
On 17 December 1996 armen Sallés y Barangueras was titled as venerable after Pope John Paul II confirmed that she had lived a life of heroic virtue.

A miracle was investigated before the process received validation from the Congregation of the Causes of Saints on 13 January 1995. On May 3, 1992, the Medical Council met for the examination of a nun's sudden recovery from terminal tubercular espondylitis, with the appearance of new vertebrae in place of ruined ones. The recovery was judged to be rapid, complete, with no medium- or long-term outcomes, and scientifically unexplained. John Paul II approved that the investigated healing was indeed a miracle on 18 December 1997 and presided over the beatification on 15 March 1998.

A second miracle was investigated and Pope Benedict XVI approved this miracle on 19 December 2011. Benedict XVI canonized Sallés on 21 October 2012. The miracle was the cure of a Brazilian girl, Maria Isabel Gomes de Melo Gardelli, in Sao Pãulo in 1999. Gardelli suffered from a severe case of acute cerebral ischemia which left her with fatal facial deformities. A novena was said to Sallés hoping for a cure and after five days Gardelli was seemingly cured of her affliction.
