= Shio Batmanishvili =

Georgian Greek Catholic hieromonk and martyr (1885–1937)

The Reverend Shio Batmanishvili
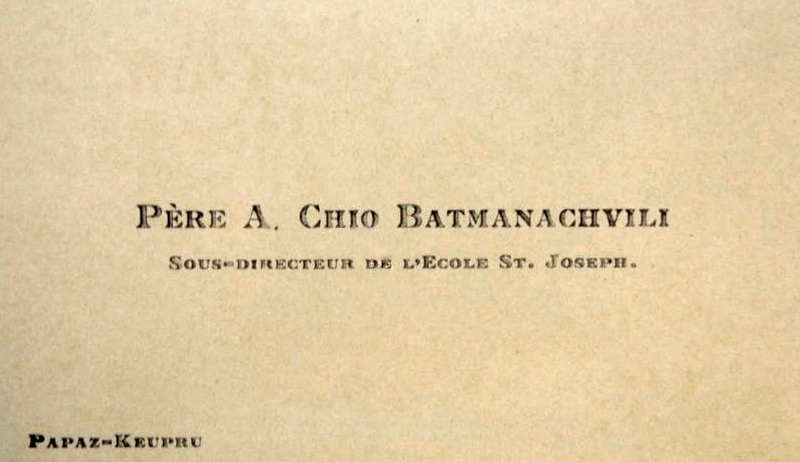
- Visiting Card of Shio Batmanashvili in French

Personal life
- Born: Shio Batmanishvili; 1885 Akhaltsikhe, Tiflis Governorate, Russian Empire
- Died: November 1, 1937 (aged 51–52) Karelia, Russian Soviet Federative Socialist Republic)

Religious life
- Religion: Georgian Catholic Church
- Ordination: 1912

Military service
- Rank: Priest

Shio Batmanishvili (Georgian: შიო ბათმანიშვილი; 1885 – November 1, 1937) was a Georgian Greek Catholic priest and the superior of the Servites of the Immaculate Conception. He was survivor of the Gulag at Solovki prison camp, and a martyr during Joseph Stalin's Great Purge.

== Biography ==
Batmanishvili was born in 1885 in Akhaltsikhe, in the Tiflis Governorate of the Russian Empire (today in Georgia). He studied at the Seminary of Constantinople and later theology in Rome, being ordained a priest in 1912. He initially exercised his ministry at Kutaisi and Akhaltsikhe, and from 1922 he was superior of the Servites of the Immaculate Conception's monastery at Our Lady of Lourdes Church in Constantinople.

In 1925, Batmanishvili was received by Pope Pius XI, along with a group of Eastern Catholic priests, and was appointed Apostolic Administrator (other sources indicate that he was also appointed Exarch) for the Georgian Greek Catholic Church.

On 16 October 1927, Batmanishvili was arrested in Tbilisi and on 16 January 1928 he was sentenced to ten years of hard labor without the possibility of amnesty, under Articles 58-6 and 58-12 of the penal code of the RSFSR, and was sent to the Solovki prison camp, where he arrived on February 12. In July 1932, he was accused of anti-Soviet agitation, participating in secret liturgies and religious rituals, and transmitting information abroad on the persecution of Catholics in the USSR. As a result he was isolated from the rest of the prisoners. In May 1935, Batmanishvili was transferred to work on the Kirov railroad, and in June 1936, he returned to Solovki. On 14 October 1937, he was sentenced to death by the Directorate of the NKVD and executed on November 1, 1937 in Medvezhegorsk and buried at Sandormokh.

== See also ==
- Simon Mchedlidze
