= Cathedral of the Assumption of the Virgin, Tbilisi =

Coordinates: 41.69254°N 44.80353°E

Cathedral of the Assumption of the Virgin
- თბილისის ღვთისმშობლის ამაღლების კათოლიკური ეკლესია
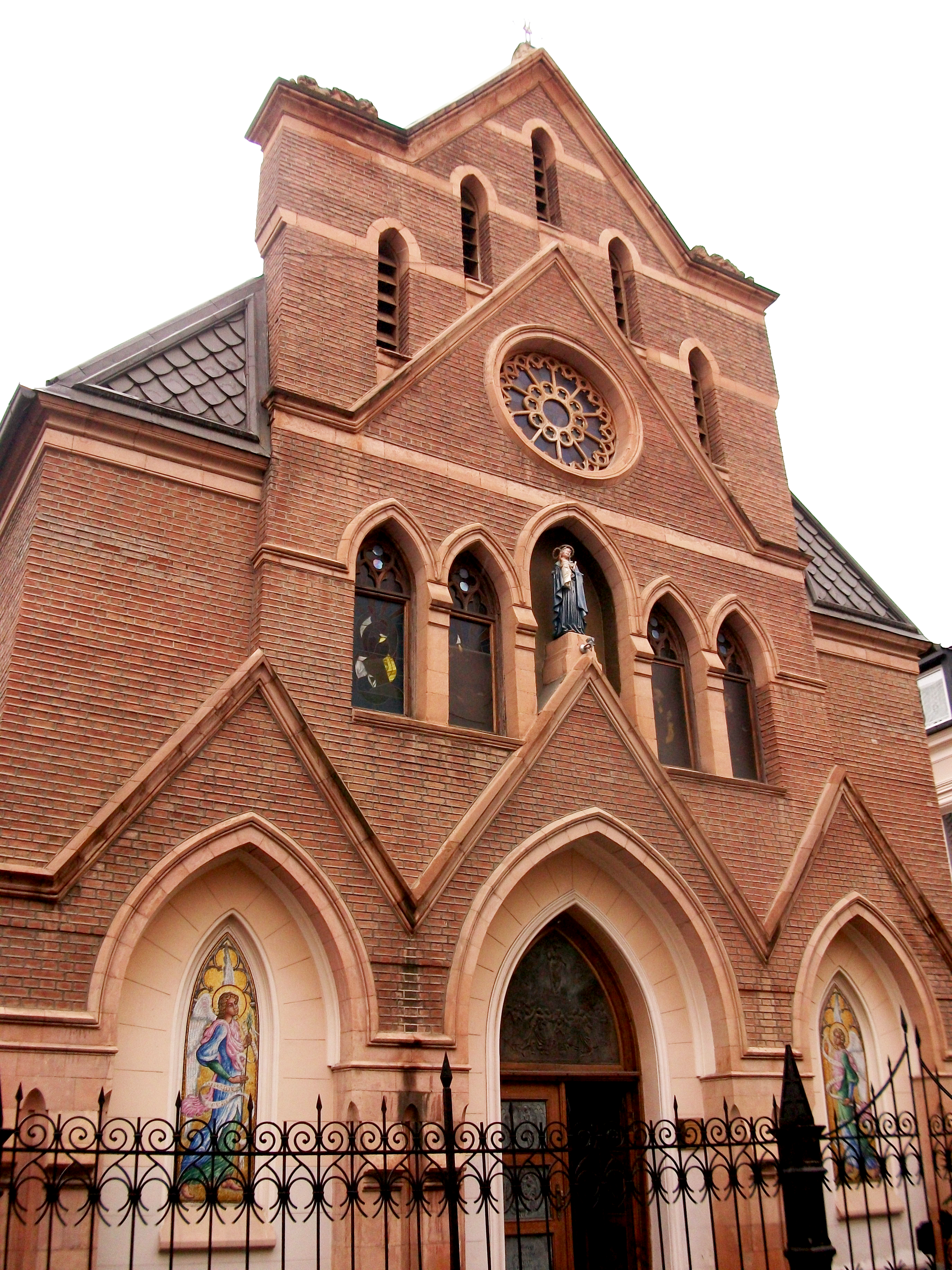
- Cathedral of the Assumption of the Virgin
- Location: Tbilisi
- Country: Georgia
- Denomination: Roman Catholic Church

Architecture
- Groundbreaking: 1805
- Completed: 1808

The Cathedral of the Assumption of the Virgin or the Catholic Church of the Ascension of the Virgin Mary (Georgian: თბილისის ღვთისმშობლის ამაღლების კათოლიკური ეკლესია) It is a Roman Catholic cathedral in Tbilisi, the Georgian capital. It is the seat of the Latin Apostolic Administration of the Caucasus (Latin: Administratio Apostolica Caucasi Latinorum) which it was created in 1993 with the decree Quo aptius.

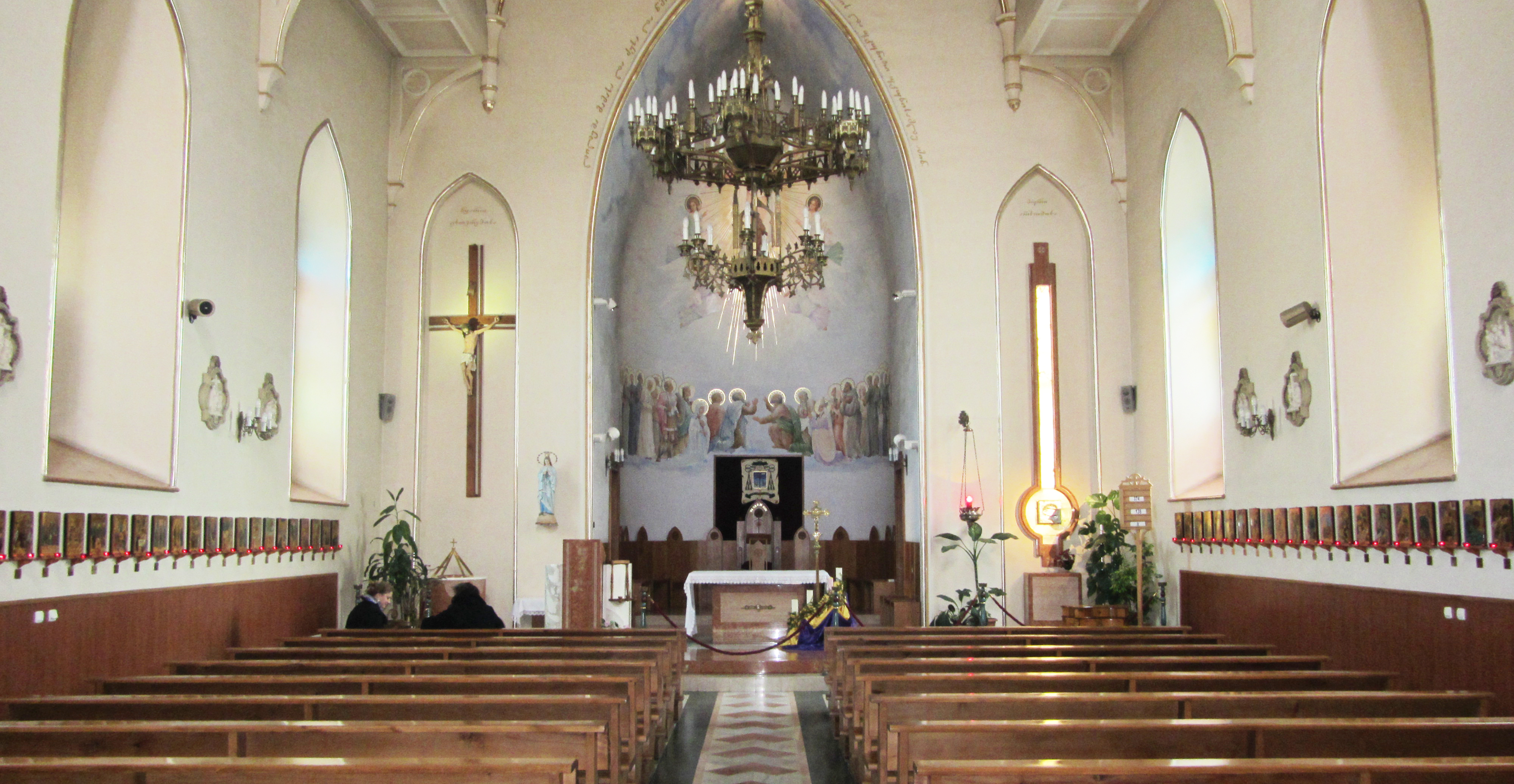
Interior

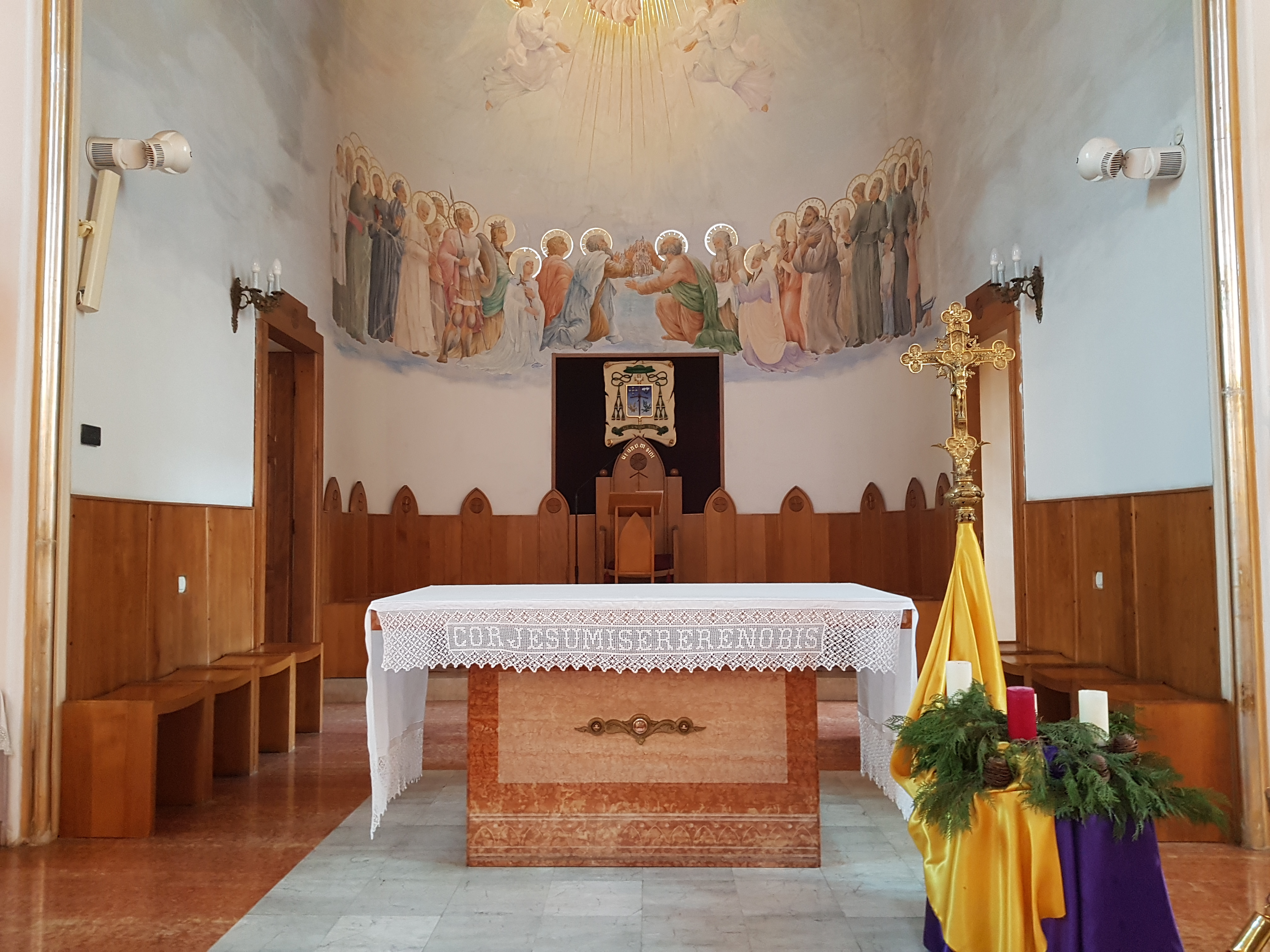
Altar

A long history preceded the construction of the structure. Where is the cathedral was where the first Catholics settled in the thirteenth century. In 1240 the Dominicans founded a monastery. In 1328 a cathedral dedicated to St. John the Baptist was built and Tbilisi became an Episcopal seat (which suspended its operation in the sixteenth century). During the seventeenth century Catholic missionaries returned to Georgia and built a new church dedicated to the Annunciation (the "Latin Church in the Catholic form"). This Catholic structure were then privately for King Teimuraz II.

The current cathedral was built in front of the Church of the Annunciation (no longer exists) between 1805 and 1808 by the monk Philipo Foranian (then the Catholic parishes in Georgia were part of the Archdiocese of Mohilev, until 1848, and later the Diocese of Tiraspol). In 1937 the church was confiscated by the soviets, but after Georgia regained independence it was returned to the faithful in 1999.

== See also ==
- Roman Catholicism in Georgia
