= St. Peter and St. Paul's Church, Tbilisi =

Coordinates: 41.7097°N 44.8017°E

St. Peter and St. Paul's Church
- თბილისის წმინდა პეტრესა და პავლეს კათოლიკური ეკლესია
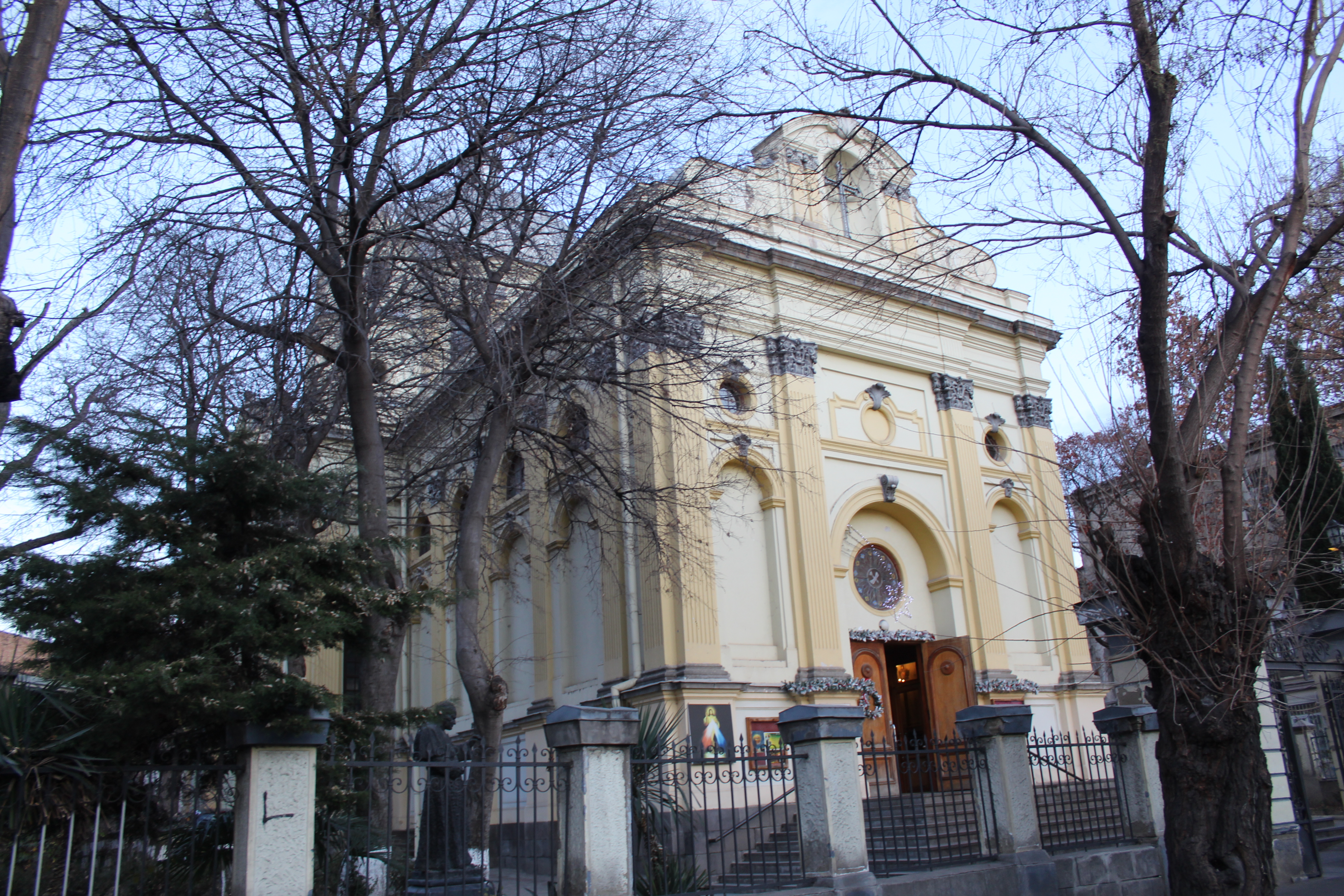
- St. Peter and St. Paul's Church
- Location: Tbilisi
- Country: Georgia
- Denomination: Roman Catholic

The St. Peter and St. Paul's Church (Georgian: თბილისის წმინდა პეტრესა და პავლეს კათოლიკური ეკლესია) is a Roman Catholic church in Tbilisi, the Georgian capital. Pope John Paul II celebrated Mass there during his visit to Georgia in October 1999.

The church was built between 1870 and 1877 on the initiative of Konstantine Zubalashvili, an important member of the Catholic community in Georgia. The project was entrusted to the architect Albert Zaltsman. The architecture of the church is characterized by a marked baroque style.

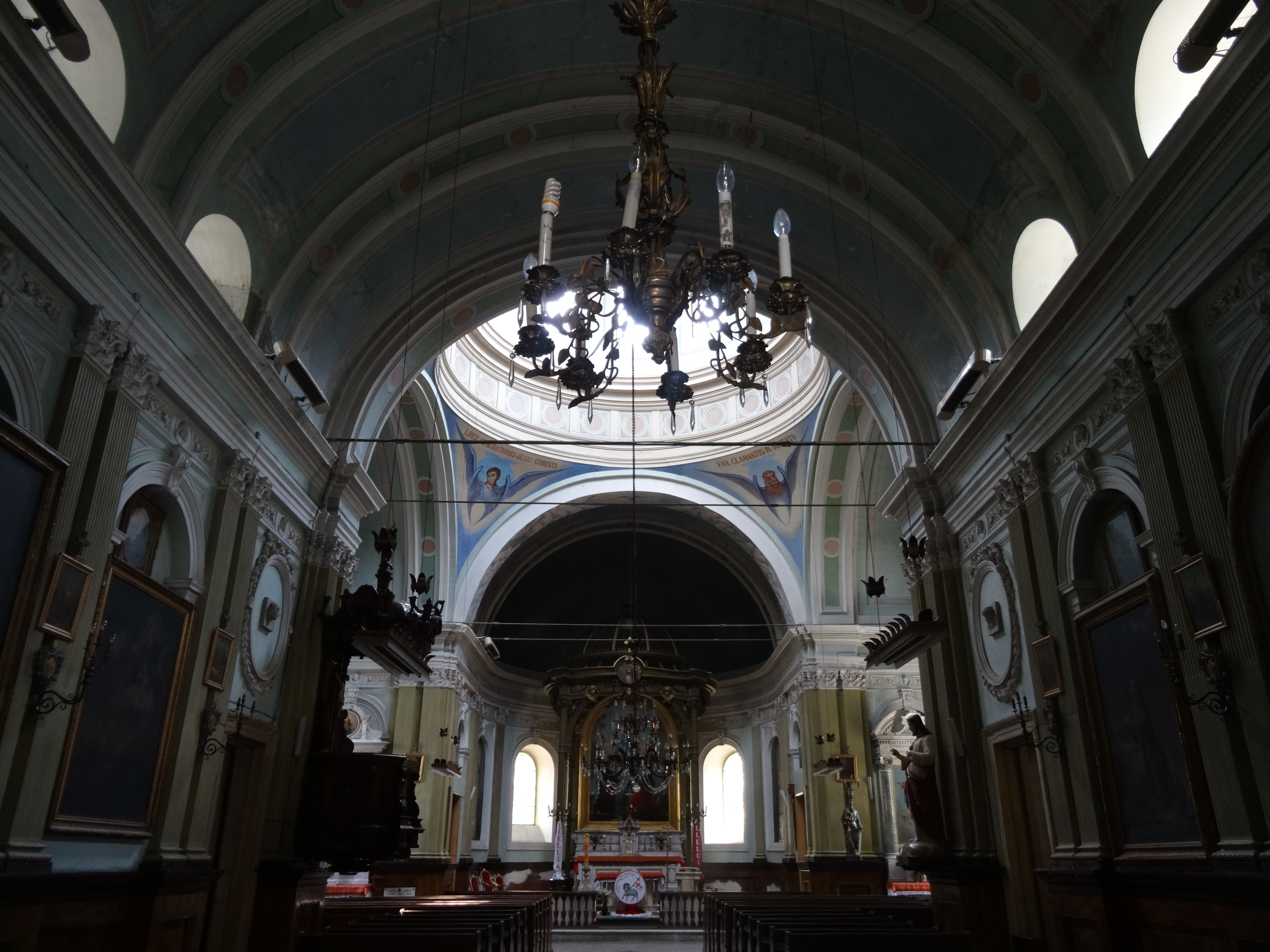
Interior

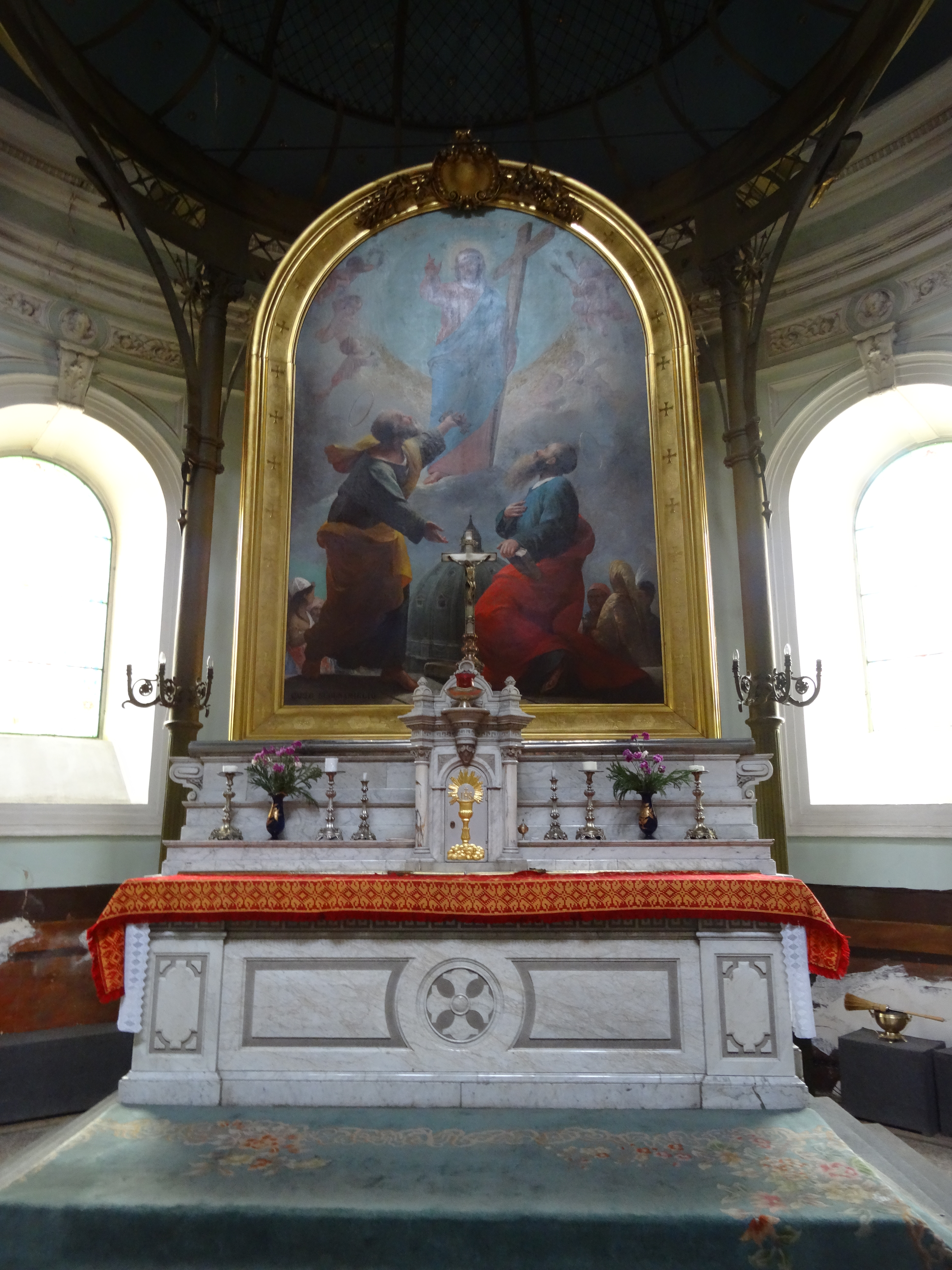
Altar

The church entrance is west. Above the wooden front door there is a rose window decorated with floral ornaments and a dove. These were added in the years after 2000, while the original very high and arched door was transformed into a wall, where the rose window was put, and the church painted in yellow. Its original colour used to be white and silver-grey. The facade is divided by pilasters and arches of a more intense yellow (which used to be originally silver-grey) of Corinth that the rest of the structure.

== See also ==
- Roman Catholicism in Georgia
