= Apostolic Administration of the Caucasus =

Catholic ecclesiastical territory in Georgia and Armenia

Coordinates: 41°41′32″N 44°48′15″E

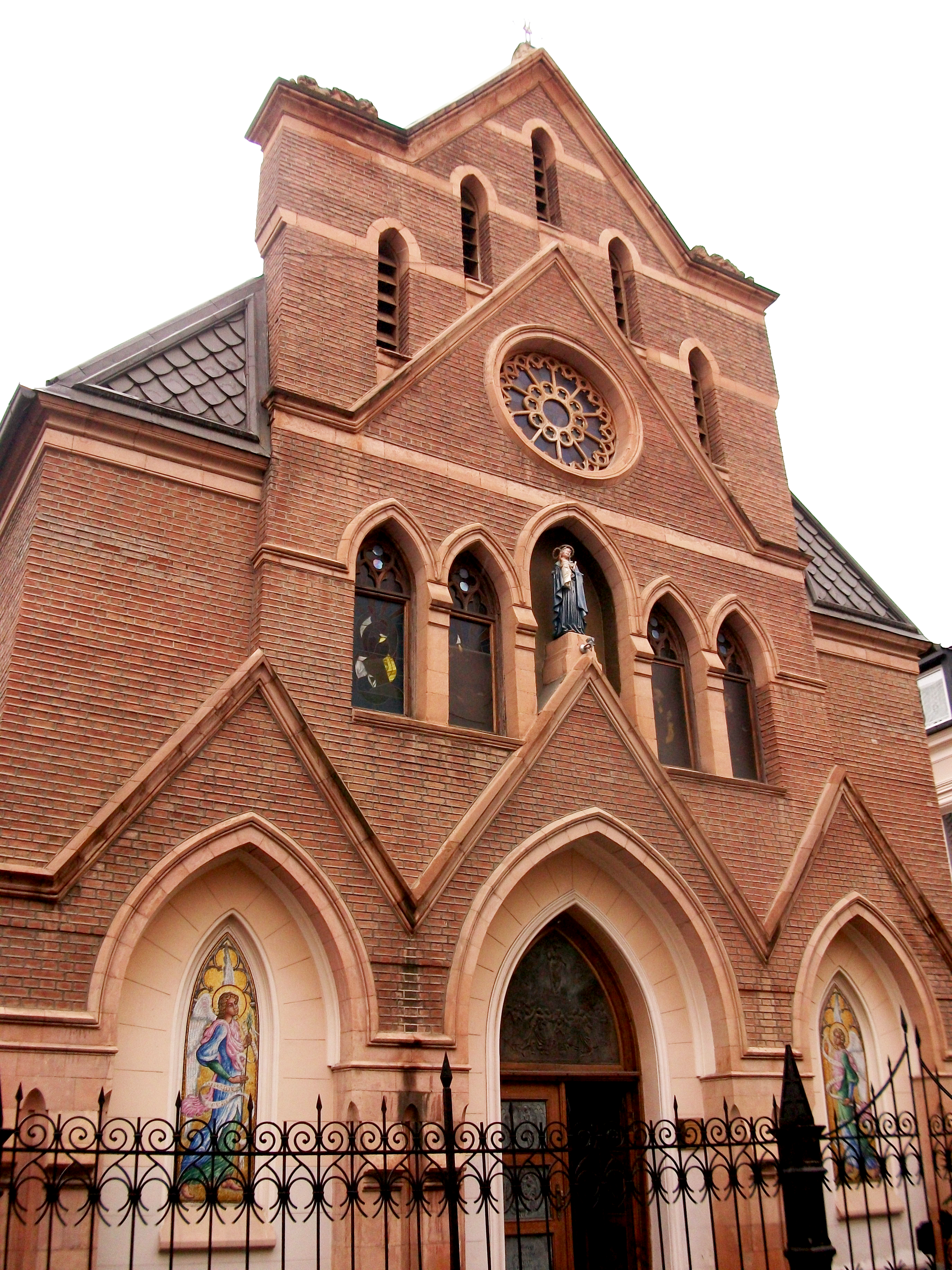
St. Maria's Catholical Cathedral Church in Tbilisi

The Apostolic Administration of the Caucasus (Latin: Administratio Apostolica Caucasi Latinorum) is an apostolic administration (pre-diocesan jurisdiction) of the Latin Church in the Catholic Church, established in 1993, with headquarters in Tbilisi, capital of Georgia.

It is exempt, i.e. directly subject to the Holy See, and to its Dicastery for the Eastern Churches, rather than part of any ecclesiastical province. Since 1996, Giuseppe Pasotto is the current Apostolic Administrator of the Caucasus.

== History ==
The Apostolic Administration of the Caucasus was erected on 30 December 1993, during the pontificate of Pope John Paul II by the decree Quo aptius of the Congregation for Bishops. to pastorally cover Armenia, Azerbaijan and Georgia, a territory split off from the Diocese of Tiraspol (between 1991 and 1993 de facto under the Apostolic Administration of European Russia).

On 11 October 2000, it lost jurisdiction over Azerbaijan, which was transferred to the newly erected Mission sui iuris of Baku, which was soon promoted to an Apostolic prefecture.

It enjoyed papal visits by Pope John Paul II (July 1999, November 1999 and September 2001) and Pope Francis (June, September and October 2016).

== Cathedral see ==
The cathedral episcopal see of the Apostolic Administration is the Cathedral of the Assumption of the Virgin in Tbilisi (capital of Georgia), dedicated to the Assumption of the Blessed Virgin Mary.

== Territory ==
The Apostolic Administration of the Caucasus pastorally serves Catholics of the Roman Rite of the whole of Armenia and Georgia (including Adjara), and the partially recognized states of Abkhazia and South Ossetia.

Catholics of Armenian rite of the Armenian Catholic Church, one of the Eastern Catholic Churches of the Catholic Church, are however within the Ordinariate for Catholics of Armenian Rite in Eastern Europe, which is headquartered in Gyumri, Armenia.

== Statistics ==
As of 2014, it pastorally served 50,000 Catholics in 11 parishes with 23 priests (15 diocesan, 8 religious), 41 lay religious (13 brothers, 28 sisters) and 4 seminarians.

== Apostolic Administrators ==
Apostolic Administrators of the Caucasus
From	Until	Incumbent	Notes
1993	1996	Jean-Paul Gobel; Titular Archbishop of Calatia	Appointed apostolic administrator on 30 December 1993. Consecrated titular archbishop on 6 January 1994. Also apostolic nuncio to Armenia and Georgia from 7 December 1993 and to Azerbaijan from 15 January 1994. Ceased to be apostolic administrator on 29 November 1996.
1996	present	Giuseppe Pasotto C.S.S. Titular Bishop of Musti	Appointed apostolic administrator on 29 November 1996. Appointed titular bishop on 9 November 1999 and consecrated on 6 January 2000.

== See also ==
- Armenian Catholic Church
- Catholic Church in Georgia

== Sources and external links ==
- GCatholic, with Google map
- Catholic-hierarchy.org
