= Our Lady of Lourdes Church, Istanbul =

Church of Our Lady of Lourdes
- Notre Dame de Lourdes Gürcü Katolik Kilisesi
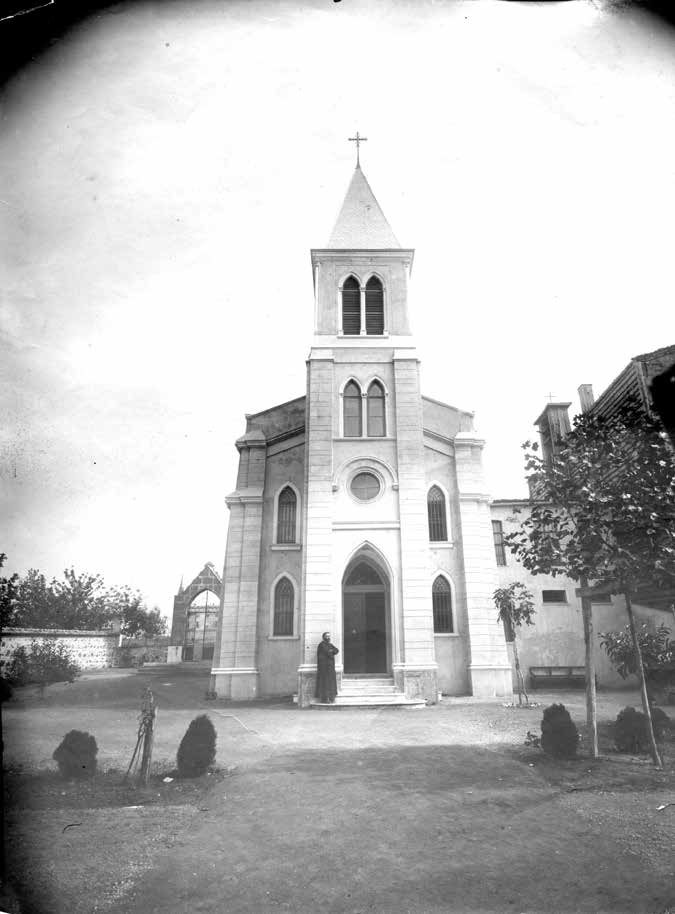
- An image of the church in the 19th century
- Church of Our Lady of Lourdes
- Location: Istanbul
- Country: Turkey
- Denomination: Georgian Greek Catholic Church

History
- Founded: 1861
- Founder: Peter Kharischirashvili
- Dedication: Our Lady of Lourdes

Architecture
- Style: Neo-Gothic

The Church of Our Lady of Lourdes (Turkish: Notre Dame de Lourdes Gürcü Katolik Kilisesi; Georgian: სტამბოლის ქართველთა სავანე) is a historic parish of the Georgian Greek Catholic Church in the district of Bomonti of the Istanbul district of Şişli in Turkey. As of 2013, the church is still in use and remains one of the few Georgian Greek Catholic parishes in the world.

== History ==
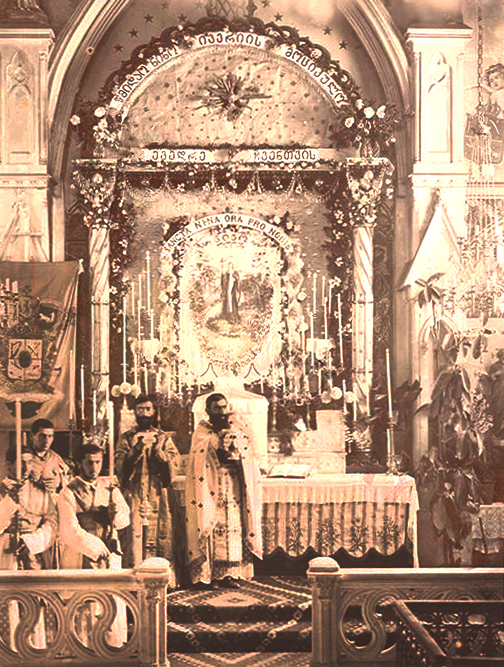
Interior, circa late 19th century

It was built in 1861 at the initiative of the Catholic priest Peter Kharischirashvili, who wished to provide a rite for Catholics in the Georgian language, but had little luck in Georgia itself. It was dedicated to Our Lady of Lourdes in 1862 (after initially being dedicated to the Immaculate Conception), soon after the devotion was approved by the pope. Along with the parish church, Kharischirashvili founded two monasteries: one for men and one for women. The monasteries and the church used the Georgian Byzantine rite from the beginning, but it wasn't approved by the pope until 1875. The church was renovated in 1901. The library and archives founded by Kharischirashvili initially doubled as a Georgian-language printing press, publishing over 100 books on a variety of topics, including the Georgian language primer Patara Kartuli Anbani. In the 1950s, up to 10,000 ethnic Georgians of the Catholic faith lived in Istanbul. After the Istanbul pogrom in 1955 under Adnan Menderes, many Georgians and other Christians emigrated from Turkey. Today the Georgian-Catholic community numbers only 200 to 250 people. As the number of Georgian Catholic Christians in Istanbul has declined, a large part of the church community today consists of ethnic Armenians and ethnic Turkish converts to the Catholic Faith.

== See also ==
- Georgian Byzantine-Rite Catholics
- Catholic Church in Georgia
- Catholic Church in Turkey
