= Caritas Georgia =

Catholic charity organization in the country of Georgia

- Charitable Foundation Caritas Georgia
- საქართველოს კარიტასი
- Established: 3 November 1994; 31 years ago
- Type: Non-Commercial Legal Entity
- VAT ID no.: 405033501
- Location: Tbilisi, Georgia
- Coordinates: 41.7290°N 44.7260°E
- Origins: Catholic Social Teaching
- Region served: Georgia
- Field: social services, humanitarian relief
- President: Msgr. Giuseppe Pasotto
- Executive Director: Giorgi Mekhatishvili
- Affiliations: Caritas Internationalis, Caritas Europa
- Revenue: (7,511,369 GEL)
- Disbursements: 2023
- Expenses: 7,865,527 GEL (2023)
- Staff: around 350 (2023)
- Volunteers: around 100 (2023)
- Website: caritas.ge

Caritas Georgia (Georgian: საქართველოს კარიტასი) is a not-for-profit social welfare organisation in Georgia. It is a service of the Catholic Church in Georgia.

Caritas Georgia is a member of both Caritas Europa and Caritas Internationalis.

== History and work ==
Caritas Georgia began its activities in 1993 with initiatives led by volunteers. It was officially established in November 1994 as a charitable organisation of the Catholic Church in Georgia. Its primary mission was to support individuals struggling to rebuild their lives following the political and social upheaval caused by the collapse of the Soviet Union. From its inception, Caritas Georgia has focused on addressing the needs of vulnerable populations, including those living in poverty, homeless children without parental care, the sick and people living with disabilities, elderly individuals living in isolation, refugees, internally displaced persons, and residents of impoverished rural communities.

In December 1998, Caritas Georgia joined the global Caritas Internationalis confederation and the regional Caritas Europa network, strengthening its ability to collaborate on international efforts to address social challenges.

The organisation operates across several key sector, including children and youth protection and development, health care, social care, community and individual development. In addition, Caritas Georgia is also active in institutional advocacy and in emergency response and preparedness.

For example, during the first months of the COVID-19 pandemic, Caritas Georgia was distributing food and basic hygiene items to the isolated elderly persons, and running a humanitarian soup kitchen.

In 2019, Caritas Georgia launched a social enterprise called Qartuli, an art therapy studio designed for adolescents. The studio provides a creative and therapeutic environment and also sells the artwork produced by the participants.

The work of Caritas Georgia is being implemented by around 350 staff members and 100 volunteers, including international volunteers. Among its international donors are Caritas Germany, the Catholic Near East Welfare Association (CNEWA), Renovabis, Caritas Belgium, Frontex, the United States Conference of Catholic Bishops (USCCB), Caritas Italy and others, with the Ministry of Internally Displaced Persons from the Occupied Territories, Accommodation and Refugees of Georgia being the largest local funder.
