= Alois Mizandary =

Georgian pianist, composer and educator

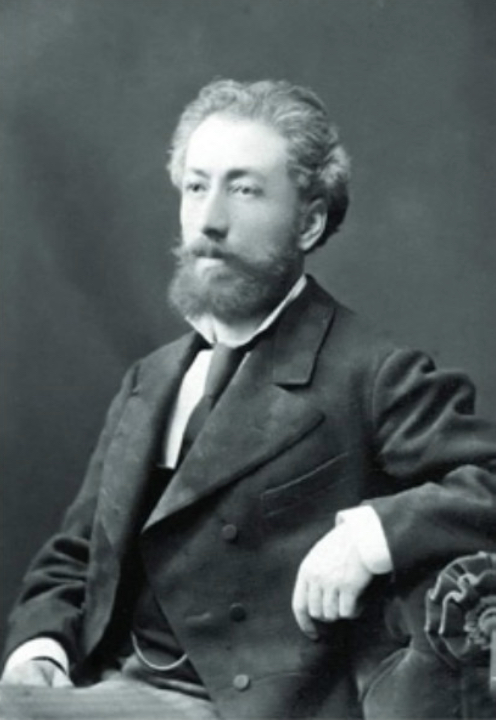
Alois Mizandary

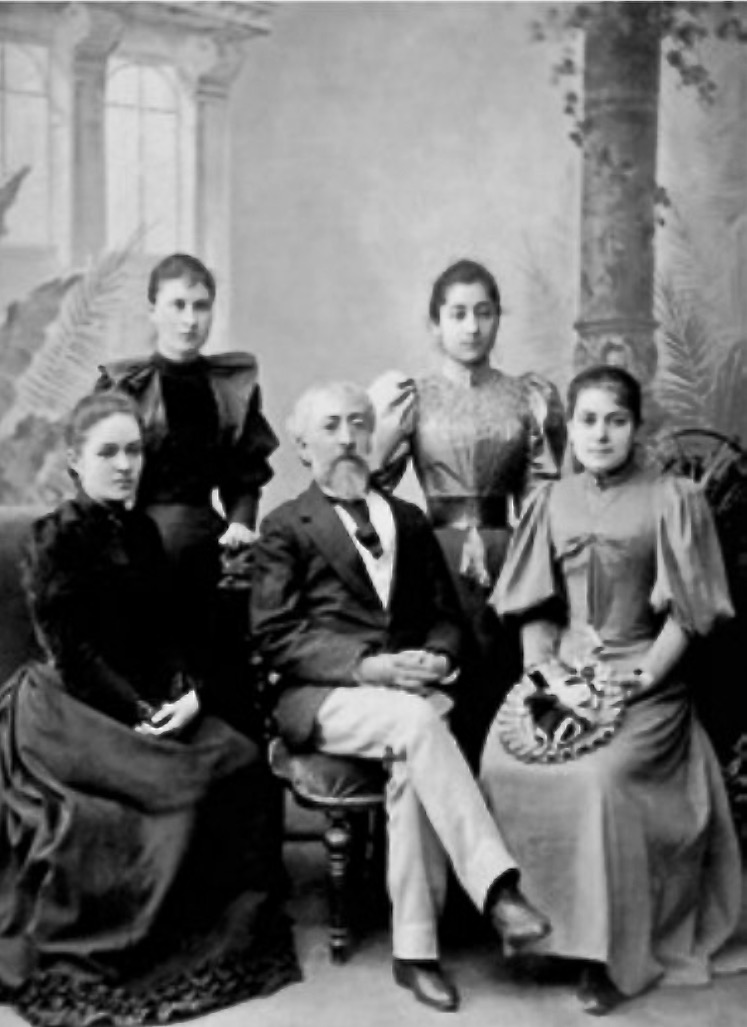
Alois Mizandary with his students

Alois Iosebis dze Mizandary (Georgian: ალოიზ იოსების ძე მიზანდარი; b. 13 September 1838 – d. 14 June 1912) was a Georgian virtuoso pianist, composer, and educator. He was one of the co-founders of a prominent music school in Tbilisi, which would decades later evolve into the Tbilisi State Conservatory.

== Biography ==
Alois Mizandary was born in Gori, Georgia, then part of the Russian Empire.

Between 1855 and 1863, he studied at the Faculty of Oriental Languages of St. Petersburg University. He performed with the university's symphony orchestra. During his time there, he knew Mily Balakirev and Anton Rubinstein, who influenced Mizandary's later work.

Mizandary performed throughout Europe and received praise for his concert performances from various newspapers of the time.

In 1874, Mizandary co-founded a music school in Tbilisi, which would grow into the Tbilisi State Conservatory by 1917.

Mindary's piano works are one of the earliest Georgian exemplars of their kind. Many works are presumed to be lost, including four-part masses composed for the Tbilisi Catholic Church.

Mizandary died in 1912 and is buried at the Didube Pantheon.

== Bibliography ==
- მიზანდარი ლ., მიზანდარი (მონოგრაფია), „გრიფონი“ 2011;
- ქართული საბჭოთა ენციკლოპედია, ტ. 6, თბ., 1983. — გვ. 679.
- ვაჩნაძე მ., ნარკვევები ქართული საფორტეპიანო მუსიკის ისტორიიდან, „ხელოვნება“, 1973;
- გიორგაძე ნ., ალოიზ მიზანდარი, თბ., 1969;
- თულაშვილი ა., ქართული პიანისტური სკოლის ფუძემდებელი, იქვე, 1954, No. 5.
- ზ. ბაბუნაშვილი, თ. ნოზაძე, „მამულიშვილთა სავანე“, გვ. 271, თბ., 1994
