= Holy Family of Bordeaux =

The Association of the Holy Family of Bordeaux was founded in France in 1820 by Pierre-Bienvenu Noailles, a canon of that city. His vision was to allow the expression of the Christian life in various forms. The Association is composed of a number of vocational groups.

== Pierre Bienvenu Noailles ==
Pierre Bienvenu Noailles was born in Bordeaux on October 27, 1793. He entered the seminary of Saint Sulpice in Paris in 1816 and was ordained on June 5, 1819. While serving as a curate at the parish of Saint Eulalia, he wished to establish an association that would serve as an umbrella organization for the practice of all the works of mercy.

== History ==
With the encouragement of Bishop Charles-François d'Aviau Du Bois de Sanzay, Noailles established the Holy Family Sisters, whose first apostolate was the care of orphans. The Holy Family Sisters arrived in Leeds in 1853 and started basic education classes for children. In 1883 they came to St. Peter's parish in Stalybridge. As well as their work in education, their ministry included visiting the sick in their homes.

The contemplative branch, also known as Solitaries, was founded in 1859 at Martillac (France).

== Present day ==
As of 2023 there are over 4000 members in 27 countries across 4 continents. The association is composed of:

- The Apostolic and Contemplative Sisters are members of a Religious Institute.
  - Apostolic sisters who perform active ministry in schools, hospitals and parishes.
  - Contemplative sisters who live a enclosed life of prayer. There are Holy Family semi-enclosed monasteries in Nagoda, Sri Lanka, Posadas, Misiones, Argentina, Oteiza, Spain, and in France at La Solitude, Martillac.
- The Secular Institute of the Holy Family of Bordeaux is composed of consecrated single women who live in their own homes and pursue their own professions.
- Priest Associates, diocesan Priests who live according to the spirituality of the Holy Family in their daily life and parish ministry.
- Lay Associates, who are committed to supported the works of the Association.
