= Petre Otskheli =

Georgian artist (1907-1937)

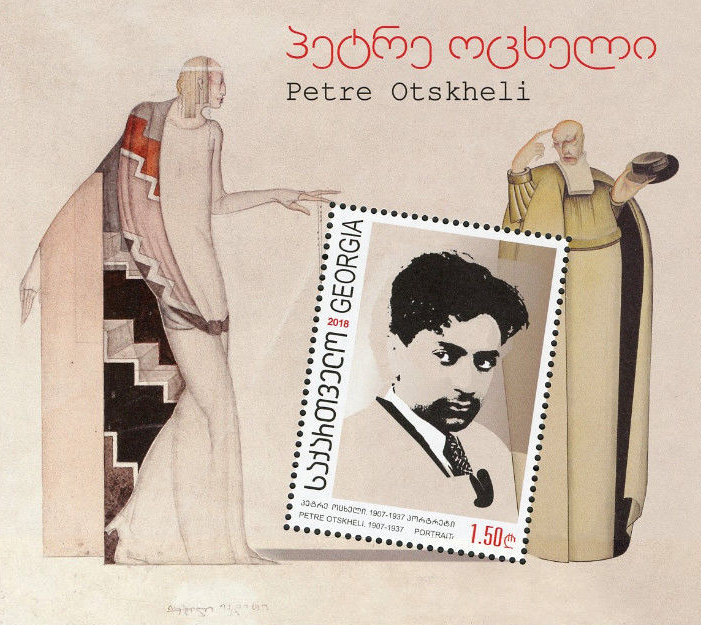
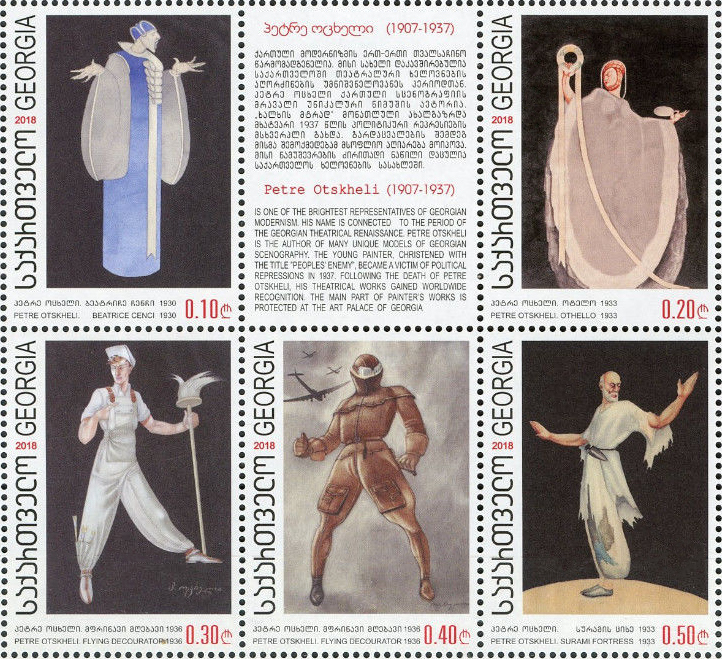
Petre Otskheli and his works on 2018 stamp sheets of Georgia.

Petre Otskheli (Georgian: პეტრე ოცხელი; 8 October 1907 – 2 December 1937) was a Georgian modernist set and costume designer who designed in theatre in Georgia and briefly in Moscow. He was put to death during Joseph Stalin’s Great Purge at the age of 30, but his scenographic constructivism has had a lasting influence on the Georgian scenic design.

Born in Kutaisi, Otskheli studied at the Kutaisi realschule and the Tbilisi State Academy of Arts in the 1920s. Through most of his career Otskheli had a creative relationship with the director Kote Marjanishvili who invited the young artist to his theatre in Kutaisi in 1928. Otskheli's visual experiments and skillful use of stage for massive designs with a series of subtle elements earned him recognition, but he soon came under pressure from Stalin's lieutenant in the Caucasus, Lavrentiy Beria. In 1936, Otskheli fled Beria's persecution to Moscow where he was recruited by his fellow countryman Sergo Amaghlobeli, then the director of Moscow Maly Theatre. In 1937, both Otskheli and Amaghlobeli were arrested and shot on trumped-up charges of treason.

In 1939, the works of Petre Otskheli were awarded a gold medal at the International Exhibition of Stage Design in London.
