= Sisters of the Immaculate Conception of the Blessed Virgin Mary =

Roman Catholic congregation for women

The Sisters of the Immaculate Conception of the Blessed Virgin Mary are a Roman Catholic religious congregation. They were founded at Marijampolė, Lithuania, by Archbishop George Matulaitis, MIC on October 15, 1918.

The sisters observe the evangelical counsels and live in their religious community. In the US, Canada and Lithuania they serve in diversified ministries: education, youth ministry, health care with the aged, social, pastoral and parish work, communications and hospitality.

== Training ==
Along with their initial spiritual training, the postulants pursue studies in preparation for their future work in the apostolate. The time of novitiate is two years after which they make their first profession of temporary vows. Perpetual vows are taken usually after five years of temporary profession.

== Qualifications ==
- Age: 18 to 40
- Completion of high school or higher.

== Habit ==
Originally, the sisters wore a full-length, tailored black dress, Roman collar and a simple black veil. At present plain navy blue outfits and short veil are worn.

== History ==
Between 1918 and 1940 the congregation in Lithuania numbered 150 sisters with its motherhouse in Marijampolė and missions in 16 other locations throughout the country. Their founder, Jurgis Matulaitis, had designated its mission to be service to the poor and needy and it took on charitable, educational, health care and various other religious ministries seeking out the less fortunate. When Lithuania was occupied by the communists in 1940, the congregation was officially disbanded as the country fell under Soviet rule. The sisters went underground, living their religious life in secret and doing apostolic work to strengthen the faith of a people suffering constant religious persecution. In 1990 when Lithuania won its struggle for independence and the church was again able to function freely, the congregation was re-established and its mission renewed and expanded with the help of the community in the USA.

The American mission, founded in 1936 with its center in Putnam, Connecticut had to function independently until 1990. Its various missions in the US and Canada served Lithuanian immigrants and local residents. Youth ministry, parish work, health care, publishing religious books and magazines and retreat work were undertaken by this relatively small community. In 1980 a new provincial house and spiritual renewal center was built in Putnam and is now functioning along with parish missions and youth ministry in Lemont, Illinois and Toronto, Ontario, Canada. A large modern Nursing Home was built nearby our provincial house and named after their founder, George Matulaitis, who was gifted with special compassion for the sick and disabled. The youth ministry is continued also in their summer Camp Neringa in Vermont. The Sisters celebrated the 90th anniversary of services in USA in 2026 and will be celebrated the 50th anniversary of Camp Neringa in 2019.

== Sponsored Ministries ==
- Matulaitis Nursing Home (Putnam, CT)
- Neringa Summer Camp
- Immaculate Conception Spiritual Renewal Center
