= Georgian Byzantine-Rite Catholics =

Eastern Catholics in the Caucasus

Georgian Byzantine Rite Catholics, or members of the Georgian Greek Catholic Church, are Catholics from the Georgian people who practice the Byzantine Rite in Old Georgian, which is also the liturgical language of the Georgian Orthodox Church. Unlike Catholics of some other eastern European traditions, they are not organized as an Eastern Catholic sui juris church.

== History ==
In 1937 Shio Batmanishvili, the Georgian Byzantine Catholic Exarch, who had been imprisoned since 1923 by the Soviet government, was executed

In The Forgotten: Catholics of the Soviet Union Empire from Lenin through Stalin, Father Christopher Zugger says that in the early 1920s nine missionaries of the Servites of the Immaculate Conception in Constantinople, headed by Bishop Shio Batmanishvili, came to Georgia to further establish the Byzantine Rite there, and that by 1929 their faithful had grown to 8,000. Tragically, their mission came to an end with the arrests of Exarch Shio and his priests in 1928, their imprisonment at Solovki prison camp, and their subsequent murder by Joseph Stalin's NKVD at Sandarmokh in 1937. Zugger cites a 1936 report that, "the Byzantine Catholic Church of Georgia had two communities, served by a bishop and four priests, with 8,000 believers", figures very similar to what elsewhere he gives as the 1929 situation.

Zugger does not state that the Georgian Byzantine Catholics were ever formally established as an autonomous particular Church, and no mention of the erection of such a jurisdiction for Byzantine Georgian Catholics exists in the Acta Apostolicae Sedis, the official gazette of the Holy See. There is no evidence therefore that the Georgian Catholics of Byzantine Rite constituted at any time an autonomous (sui iuris) Church, since canon 27 of the Code of Canons of the Eastern Churches defines these Churches as under a hierarchy of their own and recognized as autonomous by the supreme authority of the Church.

These congregations are long extinct, although some of their members were still alive in the late 1950s. The building that housed the male congregation, in Feriköy district, still stands in Istanbul, now in private ownership. Some clergy still serve a parish in Constantinople, giving Georgian Catholics in the city the possibility to worship in accordance with the Georgian Byzantine rite. This church, Notre-Dame de Lourdes, is still in service,

== See also ==
- Catholic Church in Georgia

== Sources ==
- Zugger, C.L. (2001). The Forgotten: Catholics of the Soviet Empire from Lenin through Stalin. Syracuse University Press. ISBN 978-0-8156-0679-6.
- Oriente Cattolico (Vatican City: The Sacred Congregation for the Eastern Churches, 1974)
- Annuario Pontificio
- Eastern Catholic Communities without Hierarchies
