= Armenian Rite =

Christian liturgical rite

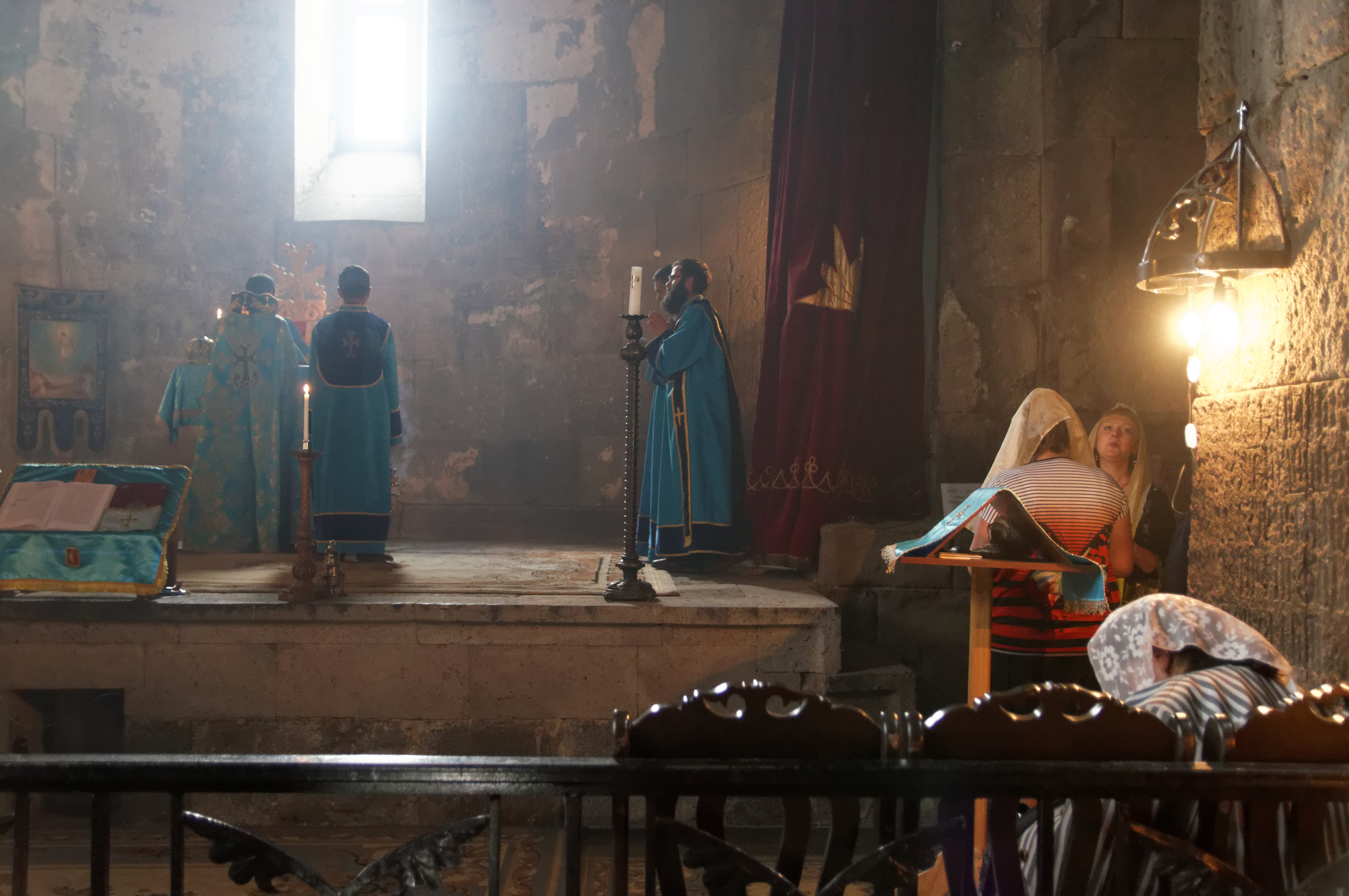
Liturgy according to the Armenian Rite in Tatev monastery

The Armenian Rite (Armenian: Հայկական պատարագ) is a liturgical rite used by both the Armenian Apostolic and the Armenian Catholic churches. Isaac of Armenia, the Catholicos of All Armenians, initiated a series of reforms with help from Mesrop Mashtots in the 5th century that distinguished Armenia from its Greek and Syriac counterparts. These reforms included a retranslation of the Bible and a revised liturgy. During the Crusades and afterwards, missionary activity by the Latin Church influenced liturgical norms and induced some Armenians to join the Catholic Church. The modern Armenian Rite features elements and interpolations from the Byzantine Rite and Latin liturgical rites, with the celebration of the Eucharist emulating the Liturgy of Saint Basil.

== History ==
Christianity in Armenia was first attested to by Roman historian Tertullian during the 2nd century AD. An apocryphal claim within an ancient Greek source claims that the apostles Thaddeus and Bartholomew introduced Christianity to Armenia in the 1st century AD. Early Greek and Syriac Christian missionaries evangelized Armenians out of the Christian nexus at Caesarea in Cappadocia. Later, Gregory the Illuminator launched a program of evangelization in Armenia that included the conversion of the king, Tiridates III. Gregory subordinated Armenian Christianity under the see of Caesarea in the early 4th century.

The subordination to Caesarea placed Armenian Christians under the authority of the Patriarch of Antioch. During the 4th century, there were debates regarding the level autonomy that the Armenians enjoyed, with Basil of Caesarea protesting these challenges. There is no evidence that Armenia ever formally broke from Caesarea during this period. Basil significantly influenced Armenian Christianity, with monasticism–particularly cenobitic monasticism–enjoying growth.

The 5th century was one of significant upheaval in Armenia and the Christian hierarchy there. After Mesrop Mashtots invented the Armenian alphabet around 405, the Bible, Divine Liturgy, and other texts were soon translated from the Greek by a group known as the Holy Translator Doctors. Both Mesrop and Isaac of Armenia, a later Catholicos, further expanded the role of monastics following the Basilian monks.

The period between the 11th and 14th centuries saw liturgical latinisation of the Armenian Rite. Following the Bagratuni dynasty's collapse in 1045, fleeing Armenians established a new kingdom around Cilicia and Cappadocia. Armenian Christians began interacting with Latin Crusaders after the establishment of the Armenian see at Cilicia in the 12th century.

== Eucharistic liturgy ==
The Divine Liturgy of the Armenian Rite is referred to as the "Liturgy of our Blessed Father the holy Gregory the Illuminator, revised and augmented by the holy patriarchs and teachers Isaac, Mesrop, Kud, and John Mantakuni", though Donald Attwater described these ascriptions as "patriotic flourishes". It is derived from the Liturgy of Saint Basil and has seen substantial influences from the Byzantine, Syriac, and Latin rites. The Armenian eucharistic liturgy, with its substantial interpolations, has also been identified as a blending of the Liturgy of Saint James and Liturgy of Saint John Chrysostom. Celebration of the Divine Liturgy is generally reserved to only Saturdays, Sundays, and great feasts; during Lent, celebrating the Divine Liturgy is relegated solely to Saturdays and Sundays.

Historically, there were at least ten anaphora used within the Armenian Rite. Presently, only one anaphora–the Patarag–remains in use, a rarity among Eastern Christian liturgies. An early recension of the Basilian anaphora from the survives in the historical record in an Armenian text, where it is described as coming from Gregory the Illuminator. This and other anaphoras were replaced in Armenian usage by a Cappadocian Greek anaphora attributed to Athanasius of Alexandria, among several translated by Catholicos John Mandakuni in the 5th century. By the mid-10th century, it is likely that Mandakuni's translated anaphora was the sole anaphora in use. The anaphora's attribution to Athanasius might explain why a 1314 Lyonese codex containing the Armenian Divine Liturgy is entitled the Missale Sancti Athanasii.

The liturgist Robert F. Taft hypothesized that there was also once an Armenian Liturgy of the Presanctified Gifts. While there is no evidence of such a Presanctified liturgy, Taft held that it may have originated from Palestinian Typika and evolved into the Armenian Liturgy of the Word, which formed the third canonical hour on Sundays.

The order of the Armenian celebration of the Divine Liturgy of the Eucharist is initially influenced by the Syriac and Cappadocian Christians, then (from the 5th century AD onwards) by Jerusalemites, then by the Byzantine Rite (from circa the 10th century) and later by the Latin liturgical rites. The Armenians are the only liturgical tradition using wine without added water. The Armenian Rite uses the unleavened bread for the Eucharist, part of their historic tradition.

== Other rites ==
A 10th-century text by Gregory of Narek, The Book of Lamentations, contains prayers that Armenian Christians believe can cure disease. These prayers are "psalmodized" and read over the sick. In commemoration of the dead, a form of animal sacrifice known as matagh (madagh) is practiced. The meat of a blessed and sacrificed animal is divided between the family that offered it and others, imitating pre-Christian sacrifices. Despite its continued practice, ecclesiastical authorities oppose matagh.

Myron, a form of chrism oil, is blessed by the Catholicos of All Armenians of the Armenian Apostolic Church every seven years. The process of producing myron begins 40 days prior to being blessed, starting as pure olive oil mixed with more than 40 flowers, herbs, and spices. Once sealed in a cauldron, the mixture is boiled for two days and with attendants stirring to prevent burning. Afterwards, the oil is strained and previously blessed chrism and additional flowers are added. During the blessing rite, which can run four hours and draws pilgrims from around the world, portions of The Book of Lamentations are recited. Once the myron is blessed, it is distributed to Armenian Apostolic bishops as a symbol of communion with the Catholicos. It is used in baptism and chrismation and to bless catholicoi, clergy, churches, altars, and all liturgical objects.

When the construction of a new church is begun, the stone crosses that will be the church's foundation are washed with water and wine before being consecrated with myron. These elements are then wrapped in a white cloth and laid in the foundation. Both the primary altar stone (vemkar) and twelve wall crosses are blessed with myron once the church is consecrated.

Latinization has been common in both the Armenian Apostolic and Armenian Catholic usage of the Armenian Rite. Among those shared by both groups are the adoption of benediction, confessionals, holy water, the Stations of the Cross, and the rosary. The 1911 Armenian Catholic synod in Rome emphasized that these Latin interpolations were part of the liturgy and should be conformed to Armenian forms.

== Vestments ==
During liturgies, priests and bishops each wear an alb-like vestment known as a shapik or shapig and a pectoral stole (porurar) under a chasuble resembling a hoodless cope (shurtshar). Armenian Catholics sometimes replace the shapik with an alb. A amice known as a vakas (also varkas and vagas) forms a high collar and is worn over the cope alongside a goti girdle and hazpan (also pazpan) forearm maniples. The vakas often features repoussé metalwork. Among non-Catholic Armenian clergy, the vakas is considered more analogous with the humeral veil. Deacons wear colored, wide-sleeved shapiks without girdles and a stole (urar) from the shoulders. Liturgical colors are not a feature of the Armenian Rite, though black may be worn at funerals. More latterly, deacons and members of the minor orders began wearing capes embroidered with crosses in the place of the vakas, though this custom was against regulations.

From the Byzantine Rite, archbishops and patriarchs wear the rhomboid konk'er (also gonker) embroidered ornament–equivalent to an epigonation–from the right side while bishops wear an omophorion and a large pallium from the shoulders. Episcopal vestments borrow two Latin elements–the mitre and the crozier (gavazan)–which were introduced during the Crusades. The modern mitres worn by Armenian Apostolic bishops more approximate tall 18th-century Latin forms than the short, soft versions of 12th-century Armenia. When Armenian bishops adopted the Latin mitre, use of the liturgical crown known as the saghavard was passed to priests; in the Byzantine Rite, this is still used by bishops. Both the mitre and pallium were introduced to Armenia by the Catholic Pope Lucius II as a present to the Catholicos of Armenia. The crown is worn by the protodeacon when a bishop celebrates a liturgy with six deacons. Among Armenian Apostolic bishops, the episcopal ring on the right little finger with the exception of the Catholicos, who uses the ring finger; Armenian Catholic bishops follow the Latin norms for rings.

Celibate clergy with the title of vardapet (also vartapet, meaning "doctor" or "teacher") may carry a staff similar to Aaron's rod with a T-shape and snake heads. The staff indicates that a vartapet has the authority to preach. During times outside liturgies, vartapets and bishops wear black cassocks. A black, pointed piece of headwear is worn with this cassock during recitation of the daily offices but not during eucharistic liturgies. Married priests, known as derders, wear a blue cassock, black mantle (verarkou), and blue turban as their standard habit. During processions, an Armenian Apostolic hierarch follows clergy who carry the archiepiscopal cross, crozier, and vartapet's staff. The trailing hierarch carries a staff which includes heraldry from their diocese.

== Liturgical language ==
Armenian Christian liturgies were initially celebrated in Greek and Syriac. However, in order to the facilitate the evangelization of all Armenians, the 5th-century Armenian church hierarchy considered the use of the vernacular necessary. The Bible, liturgies, and hymns were subsequently translated into Armenian. The ecclesiastical approbation of the Armenian language reinforced an Armenian cultural identity and vice versa.

Efforts by clergy in the Armenian Apostolic Church in the 18th century prevented the Armenian language from becoming solely a liturgical language like Coptic and Ge'ez. The modern Armenian language is colloquially used presently, meaning that while Classical Armenian (Grabar) remains in use within Armenian Rite liturgies, most faithful do not understand it. Eastern vs Western Armenian differences throughout the Armenian diaspora, particularly in the Middle East and Western world, further complicate the linguistic situation.

== Liturgical books ==
The Khorhurt'ater (also Badarakamadûitz; "Book of the Liturgy" or "Book of the Sacrament"), the Mashtots ("Book of Rituals"), the Sharakan ("Book of Hymns"), the Jhamakirk' (book of hours), and the Casoc (also Djachotz; lectionary) comprise the primary liturgical books of the Armenian Rite.

== Church architecture ==
Armenian churches are typified by a rectangular design with a central dome possessing a conical roof. Attwater described the interior of Armenian Catholic churches as "almost indistinguishable" from Latin church buildings in 1937. The common interior elements of a church built for Armenian Rite worship are a vestibule, nave, chancel, and sanctuary. The chancel, partitioned by a screen or balustrade, is elevated above the nave. The altar is located on a platform called the hem or hema. A centrally located ciborium may cover the altar under the dome; altar is more typically closer to the eastern wall. The choir is found within the sanctuary.

Tabernacles containing the reserved sacrament–the consecrated Eucharist–are common to both Armenian Apostolic and Armenian Catholic churches. The tabernacle is located near a table to the church's north (prothesis) where the sacramental bread and wine are prepared except when this preparation occurs on the altar. Lamps are found burning near every altar, of which there are generally two simpler ones on facing walls. The liturgical vessels and myron are stored in a cupboard adjacent to the altar. A curtain known as a varakoyr is strung from wires in front of the altar. During Lent, a picture of the Crucifixion is located in front of this curtain.

== See also ==
- Oriental Orthodox Churches
- Eastern Catholic Churches
- Georgian Byzantine-Rite Catholics

== Bibliography ==
- The Armenian Liturgy, translated into English. Venice: San Lazzaro degli Armeni. 1867. pp. 95 – via archive.org.]
