= Catholic Church in North Macedonia =

Macedonian organisation

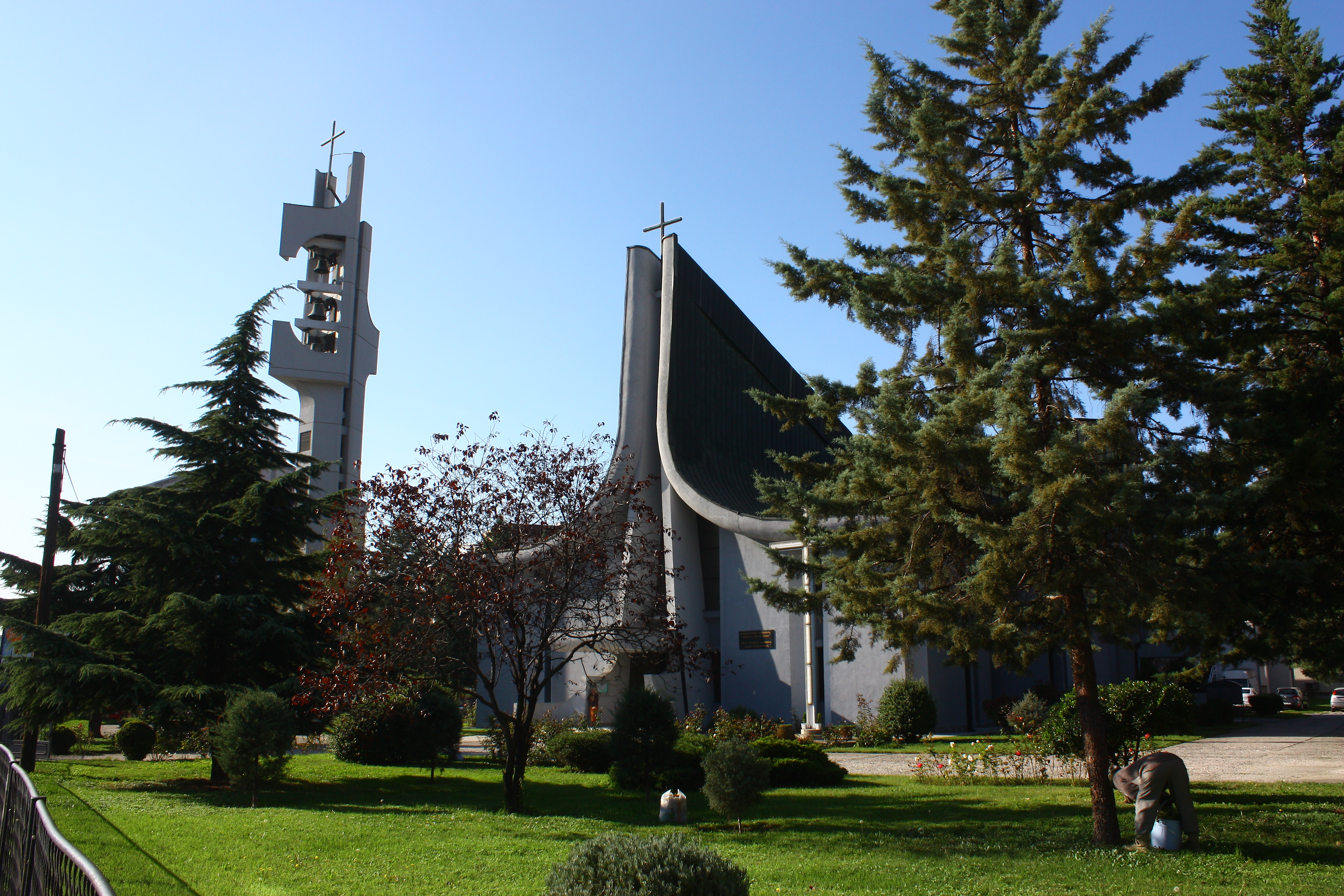
Cathedral of the Sacred Heart of Jesus in Skopje

The Catholic Church in North Macedonia is part of the worldwide Catholic Church, under the spiritual leadership of the Pope in Rome and is one of the major religious communities that exist on the territory of the Republic of North Macedonia. Catholic believers from North Macedonia mostly include Albanians, Macedonians and Croats and are most concentrated in the Skopje Statistical Region and the Southeastern Statistical Region of North Macedonia.

In 2020, it was estimated that there are 15,000 Catholics in the country, less than 1% of the total population; there were 50 nuns and priests serving across 11 parishes.

Macedonian Caritas is the largest Catholic charity in North Macedonia, active both in social welfare and humanitarian aid.

== The beginning of Christianity ==
In the 6th century, Emperor Justinian I (born in Tauresium, today's Gradište in North Macedonia) advanced the status of Christianity across the Eastern Roman (Byzantine) Empire, and is venerated in both the Eastern Orthodox Church and the Roman Catholic Church. After Justinian I, the next cycle in which Christianity began to spread began in the 9th century, when Clement of Ohrid and Saint Naum instituted the Ohrid Literary School during the Christianization of Bulgaria. At the time, there was a creation of parishes in alignment with the Archbishopric of Ohrid whose autocephaly was maintained until 1767, when the Turks, influenced by the Ecumenical Patriarchate of Constantinople, suspend it.

== Skopje Catholic bishops ==
Diocese of Skopje, under whose jurisdiction are believers of the Western or Roman rite is one of the oldest dioceses in the Balkans and its territory historically is not enough investigated. Many important historical facts are unsolved today. To a better overview, church history in these areas could be divided into three main periods.

=== First period ===
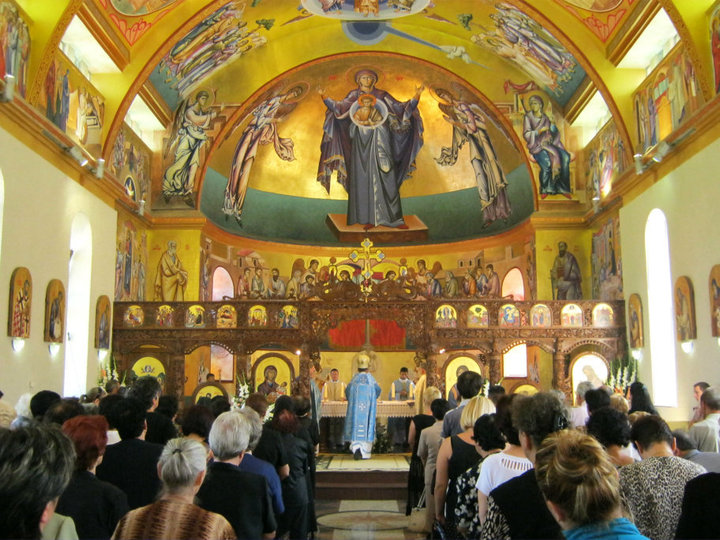
Assumption of Our Lady Church, in Strumica.

The first period of the Christianity in North Macedonia begins with the appearance of Christianity in Europe. Paul the Apostle was missionary at this time. Christianity was present in these areas illustrated by the fact that the Council of Nicea (325), signed between the Assembly's fathers, and the Bishop of Dacosta Scupi (Skopje) was mentioned as bishop in charge of Dardania (Europe) province, whose capital is Skopje, and extends from Niš until Veles (city). The existence of the Diocese does not refer to a clearly defined religious organization in the province headed by Bishop and several bishops. This period is called the "golden period" for the province. Later writers' mention showed five dioceses within the province of Dardania. Pope Gelasius I sent a letter to the six Dardanian bishops of the time.

=== Second period ===
The second period is characterized by turbulent conditions and switch to the ends of these arms in the hands of various new rulers. With the arrival of the Turks a hard time for Christians in these areas arose. Five centuries of Ottoman slavery occasionated severe consequences in the diocese. But in a report in Rome dating from 1584, Skopje is mentioned as Catholic Center.

=== Third period ===
This period coincides with the founding of the Congregation de Propaganda Fide in 1622. In this period, the Catholic Church devoted more attention to these areas. The apostolic succession of the Catholic Archbishops of Skopje since Andrea Bogdani, an Albanian born in modern day Kosovo (1651-1656) until today is continuous. Generally all residential Catholic bishops of Skopje are residential, although many times were forced, because of the Turkish mischief, to change their place of residence, concealing in inaccessible places. Until 1914 Skopje bishops were titled "archbishops". But in a Concordat between the Holy See and the Kingdom of Serbia the title of Archbishop was transferred to the bishop of the Archdiocese of Shkodër-Pult. Its last Archbishop was Lazër Mjeda (also an Albanian) in 1921 when he was appointed Archbishop of the Archdiocese of Shkodër-Pult. In 1924, after the devastation of World War I, the archdiocese was downgraded to a diocese, and became a suffragan to the Archdiocese of Vrhbosna. In 2000 Pope John Paul II divided Skopje from the Apostolic Administration of Prizren and today its jurisdiction extends throughout the territory of North Macedonia.

== Macedonian Apostolic Vicariate ==
In North Macedonia there are Catholics of Byzantine-Catholic rite that fall under the jurisdiction of the Macedonian Apostolic Vicariate.

=== Macedonian Apostolic Vicariate of the Bulgarians ===
The movement for liberation and independence gets its swing in the mid-19th century, when the whole of Europe was waking up to a national consciousness. This movement also took place in North Macedonia. In the struggle for religious freedom from the Hellenic influence the national spirit of the Macedonian people awoke and the spirit of ecclesiastical independence from Constantinople Patriarchate also arose. After several unsuccessful attempts by various independent churches to free themselves from the jurisdiction of the Patriarch of Constantinople, a group of local Bulgarians eventually joined the Catholic Church in 1859. The center of this movement was the town of Kilkis, what is known as "Union of Kukush". In 1861, the Bulgarian Catholic Apostolic Vicariate of Constantinople was created for the Eastern-Catholic Bulgarians of the Byzantine Rite in European provinces of the Ottoman Empire, including the then region of Macedonia. In 1883 as its off-shoot, was created a Macedonian Apostolic Vicariate of the Bulgarians based in Thessaloniki. Its first appointed Apostolic Vicar was Lazar Mladenov.

=== Pastoral Vicariate ===
With the creation of the Apostolic Vicariate of the Bulgarians in North Macedonia, a legal structure of the Catholic Church of the Byzantine rite in North Macedonia was established. Bishop Mladenov indicates a clear direction for the development of the Catholic Church of Eastern Rite. But unfortunate circumstances affected this region: the Ilinden Uprising, the Balkan Wars and World War I reflected negatively on the Catholic population. After the First World War the Eastern rite Catholics were found in Vardar Macedonia and Strumica region, and the Pope placed them under the care of the then Catholic Archbishop of Skopje. On October 19, 1923 with the provision of the Vatican they became an integral part of the Eparchy of Križevci and remained as such until 2001.

=== Apostolic Exarchate ===
Pope John Paul II on January 11, 2001 in Vatican signed a decree to establish an Apostolic Exarch for Catholics of the Eastern rite in North Macedonia. The first Apostolic Exarch appointed was Monsignor Joakim Herbut, bishop of the Diocese of Skopje. The seat of the exarchate is the city of Strumica, and the Assumption Church in this city holds the title of Cathedral.

=== Eparchy ===
Pope Francis on May 31, 2018 elevated the Apostolic Exarchate to the rank of an Eparchy as the Macedonian Catholic Eparchy of the Assumption of the Blessed Virgin Mary in Strumica-Skopje.

Both Catholic institutions in North Macedonia are under the leadership of one person, Kiro Stojanov, perhaps the only case in the world.

== Religious buildings ==
=== Roman Catholic Diocese of Skopje ===
- Cathedral of the Sacred Heart of Jesus (Skopje)
- Holy Heart of Jesus Church in Bitola
- Saint Cyril and Methodius and Saint Benedict Church in Ohrid
- Catholic Church in Štip

=== Eparchy of the Macedonian Greek Catholic Church ===
- Cathedral of Assumption of Blessed Virgin Mary (Strumica)
- Saint Cyril and Methodius Church in Bogdantsi
- Saint Peter and Paul Church in Gevgelija
- Assumption Church in Nova Maala
- Saint Great Martyr George Church - Chanaklija, in Nova Maala
- Saint The prophet Elijah Church in Radovo
- Saint Cyril and Methodius Church (Petralinci)
- Saint Nicholas Church (Sekirnik)
- Saint Apostle Paul Church in Paljurci
- Saint Joseph Church in Bistrentsi

== See also ==
- Religion in North Macedonia
- Protestantism in North Macedonia
- Macedonian Orthodox Church

== Sources ==
- Frazee, Charles A. (2006) [1983]. Catholics and Sultans: The Church and the Ottoman Empire 1453-1923. Cambridge: Cambridge University Press. ISBN 9780521027007.
