= Saint Cyril and Methodius Church (Petralinci) =

Greek Catholic church in North Macedonia

Coordinates: 41.4706°N 22.7272°E

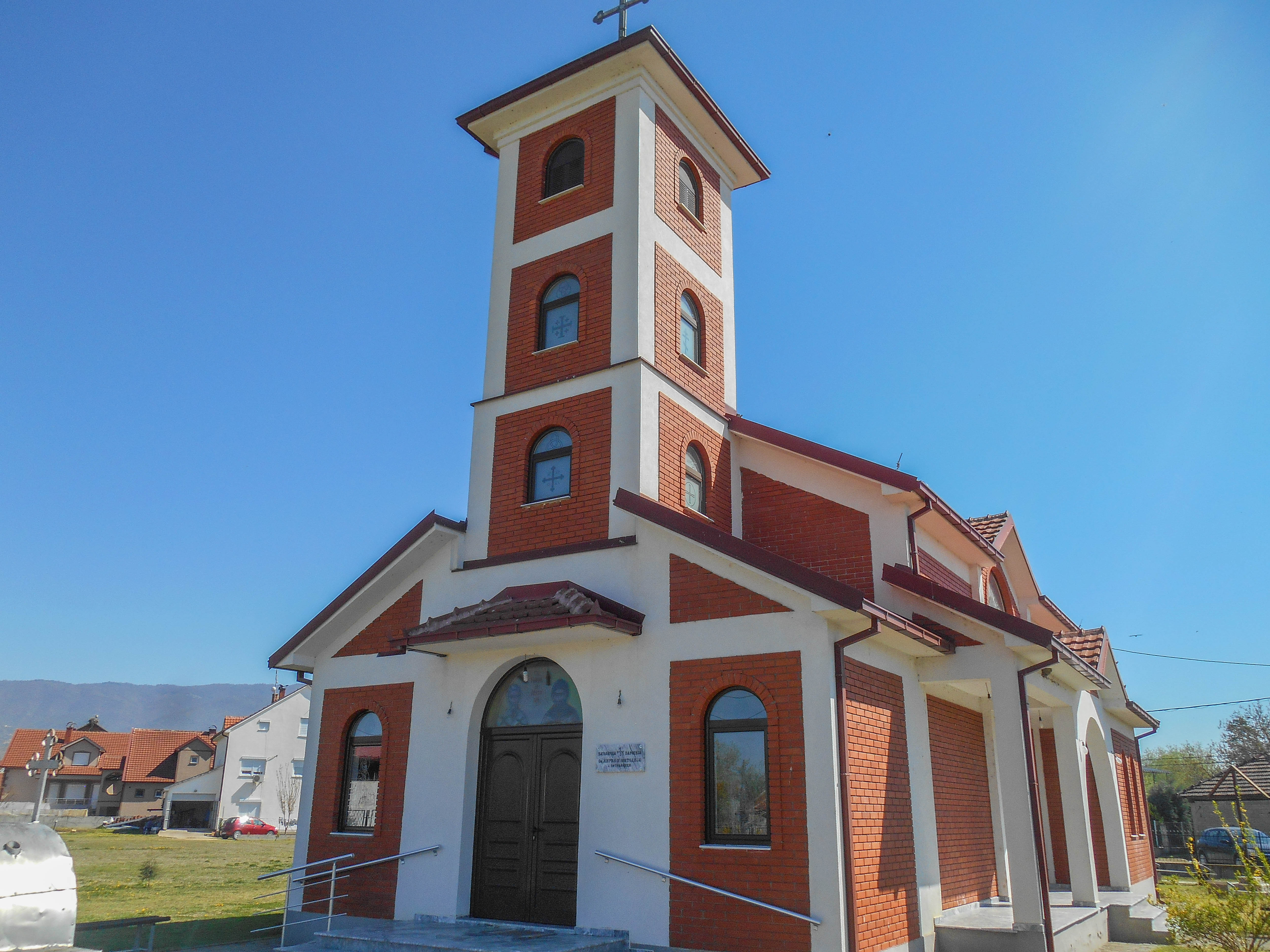
Saint Cyril and Methodius Church in Petralinci

Saint Cyril and Methodius Church (Macedonian: Католичка парохија Свети Кирил и Методиј Петралинци) is a Greek Catholic church located in Petralinci, Bosilovo Municipality, North Macedonia.

== History ==
The beginnings of the church date back to 1913, during the Second Balkan War when some Catholics abandoned their old homes in the vicinity of Kilkis and settled in the village of Petralinci.

By the construction of the first church in 1929 in the village there lived a Christian community whose religious duties and needs were performed in the nearest Catholic churches, primarily in Radovo and Strumica.

Until 1960 the church was a branch of the parish church in Radovo and since 2006 was a branch of the Assumption Church in Strumica. On 29 October 2006 the branch became a parish.

On March 10 2009, Bishop Kiro Stojanov blessed the cornerstone of the new church, which on March 7 2010 was highlighted.

== Iconostasis ==
The iconostasis in the church is a combination of icons and carving. In the first row of the iconostasis are displayed carvings with motifs from the Old Testament: Adam and Eve, the sacrifice of Abraham, the Ten Commandments and redemption of Lot in Sodom. Special attention deserves the carving of the Last Supper, which was over the king's gate, that Judas Iscariot in a rare display cupboard in the hands runs from dinner. The second row of the iconostasis are icons according to the canons of the Church, the third row is the icon of the Apostles, and the fourth line with holiday icons and ends with the crucifixion, which are under the Virgin and Saint John the Evangelist.
