= Macedonian Caritas =

Catholic social welfare and relief organisation in North Macedonia

Caritas
- Македонски Каритас
- Established: 1991; 35 years ago
- Type: Nonprofit
- Purpose: social welfare, social justice
- Location: Skopje, North Macedonia
- Coordinates: 41.9956°N 21.4172°E
- Origins: Catholic Social Teaching
- Services: social services, humanitarian aid
- Official language: Macedonian
- President: Bishop Kiro Stojanov
- Director: Father Zoran I. Stojanov
- Affiliations: Caritas Internationalis, Caritas Europa
- Website: caritas.mk

Macedonian Caritas (Macedonian: Македонски Каритас) or Caritas Macedonia is a social welfare and humanitarian charity operating in North Macedonia. It functions as a service of the Catholic Church in the country and is affiliated with Caritas Internationalis, a global confederation, as well as Caritas Europa, a regional network.

== History and mission ==
The organisation was founded in 1991 with the aim of helping people in need in Macedonia. Although an institution of the Catholic Church, it was established to serve everyone who is vulnerable, regardless of religious, national or political affiliations.

This help is provided by providing items of vital importance such as food or hygiene articles to people who need it the most, either to people experiencing poverty or to people who face a difficult situation due to a humanitarian emergency such as a disaster. People supported by Macedonian Caritas include people who are vulnerable due to a variety of reason, including poverty, old age, health status, ethnicity (e.g. Roma people) and legal status (e.g. migrants or refugees).

After the Kosovo war in 1999, the organisation provided large-scale support to refugees arriving in the country, as well as to the families displaced during the 2001 insurgency in Macedonia. The next major emergency situation in which Macedonian Caritas became active was in 2015 and the following year, during the European migrant crisis, many people fleeing the war in Syria and other people on the move, where transiting through the Balkans and needed humanitarian assistance. Macedonian Caritasteams were distributing food and hygiene packages, hot meals and clothing to refugees and migrants at the border with Greece as well as.

== Work ==
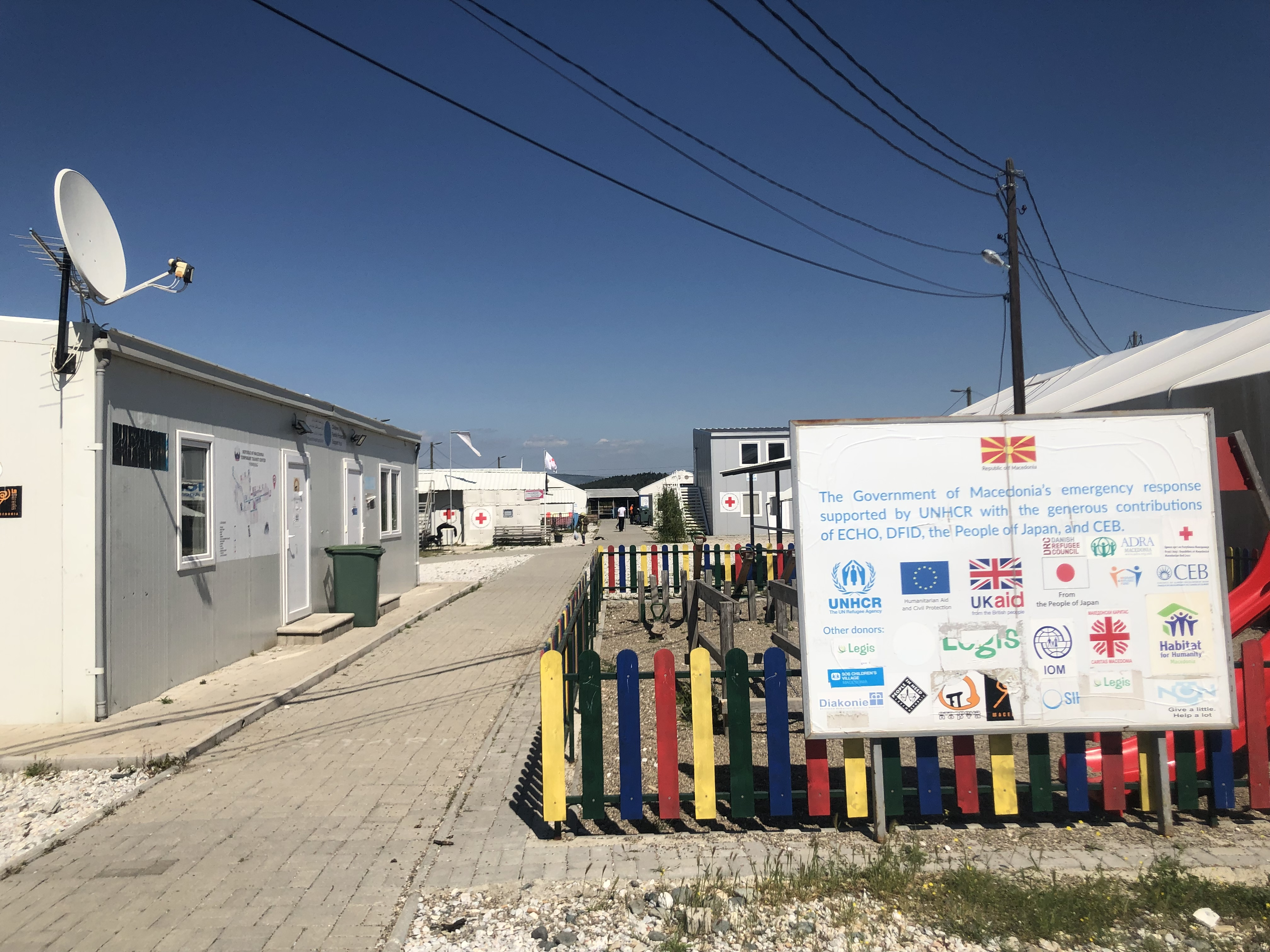
Entrance to the transit centre Vinojug for migrants and refugees near Gevgelija, where NGOs including Caritas provided support.

In 2015, Caritas Macedonia began supporting refugees by distributing food and essential items through volunteers. This initiative evolved into a structured programme within two United Nations-operated transit centres, one in Gevgelija at the Greek border and another in Tabanovce at the Serbian border.

In 2017, the organisation established the Mother Teresa Centre in Gevgelija, offering daycare services for children and young people with special needs. Starting in 2019, it launched a regional project across multiple municipalities aimed at creating employment opportunities for young people. During the COVID-19 pandemic, Caritas staff and volunteers provided food and hygiene supplies to vulnerable individuals.

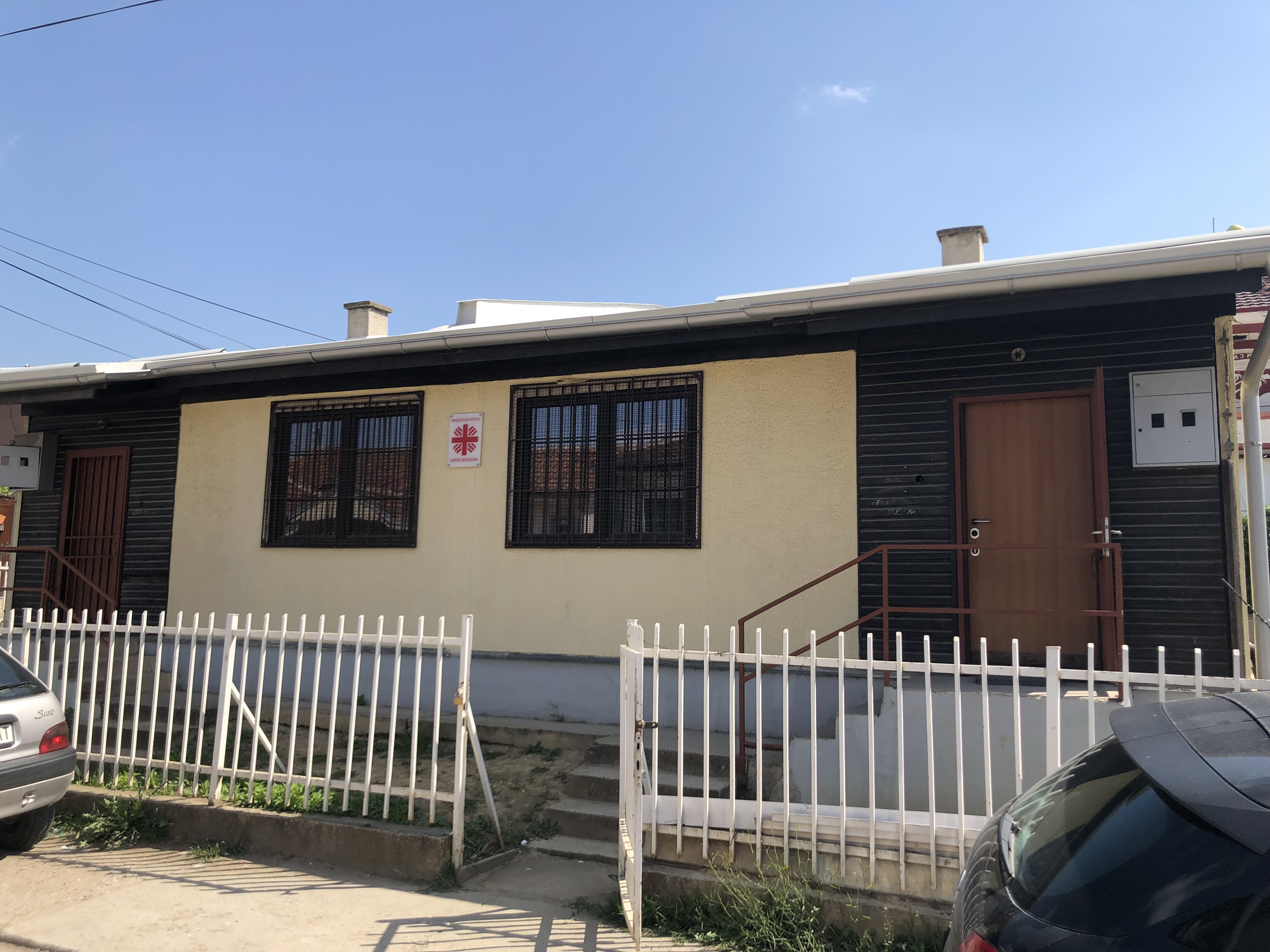
Caritas centre in Šuto Orizari.

Macedonian Caritas also operates a centre for children in Šuto Orizari, primarily assisting Roma children with homework and remedial education. In 2023, it partnered with the National MS Association to deliver groceries, firewood, and therapy to individuals affected by multiple sclerosis. Additionally, it has offered support to victims of local natural disasters, such as storms, and has raised funds for international emergencies, such as the 2019 earthquake in Albania.

== Structure ==
Macedonian Caritas serves as the social and humanitarian arm of the entire Catholic Church in North Macedonia, encompassing both the Roman Catholic and the Greek Catholic communities. It operates as a national entity, supporting and when relevant coordinating the smaller parochial Caritas organisations and the work of the religious orders who implement charitable work at a local level.
