= Macedonian Greek Catholic Church =

Eastern Catholic church

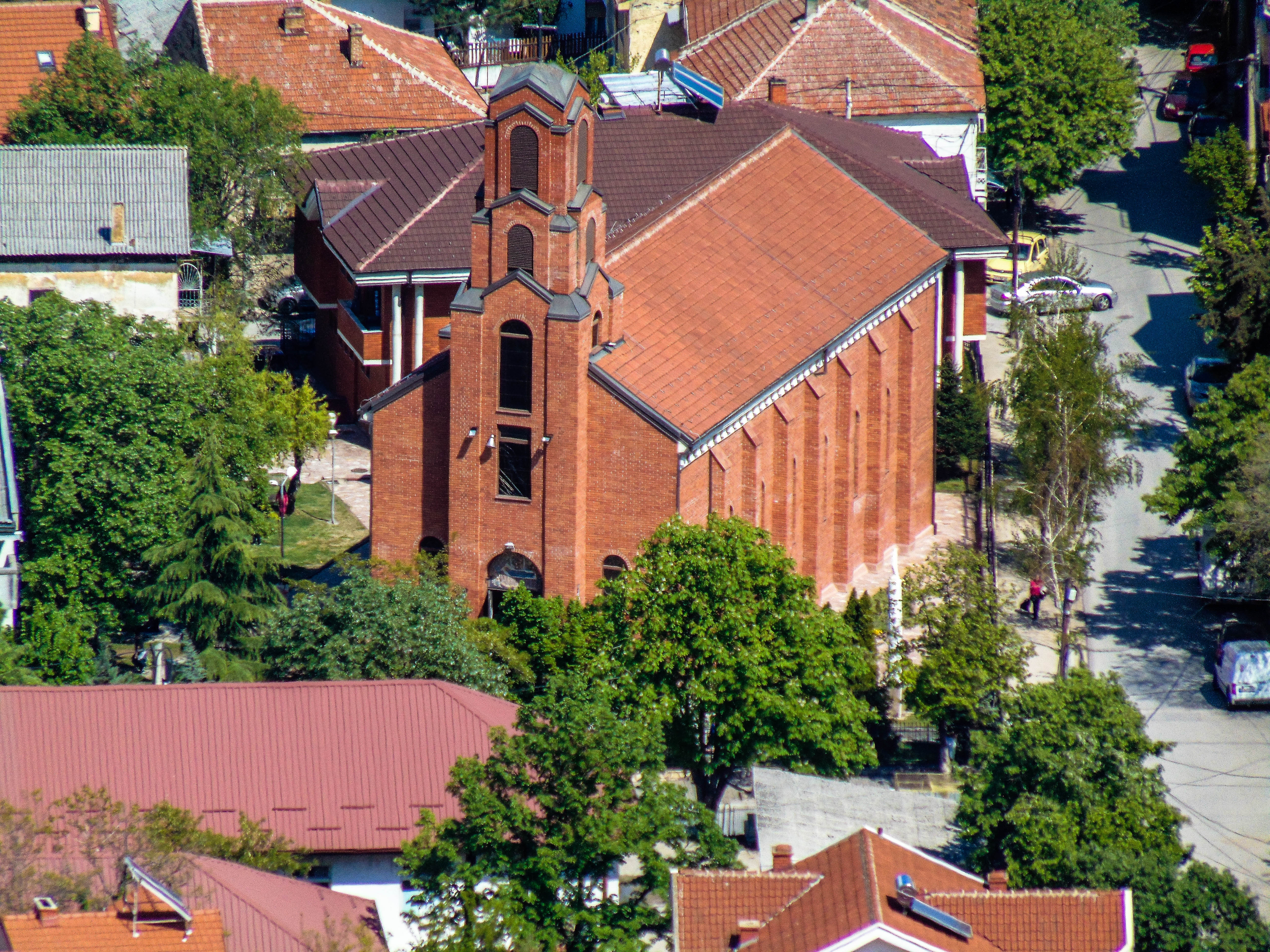
- Cathedral of the Assumption of Blessed Virgin Mary, Strumica, North Macedonia
- Classification: Eastern Catholic
- Orientation: Greek Catholic
- Polity: Episcopal
- Structure: Eparchy
- Pope: Leo XIV
- Bishop: Kiro Stojanov
- Region: North Macedonia
- Language: Macedonian
- Liturgy: Byzantine Rite
- Headquarters: Assumption of Mary Cathedral, Strumica, North Macedonia
- Founder: John Paul II
- Origin: 2001
- Separated from: Macedonian Orthodox Church
- Congregations: 7
- Members: 11,374
- Ministers: 17
- Other name: Macedonian Greek Catholic Eparchy of the Blessed Virgin Mary Assumed in Strumica-Skopje

The Macedonian Greek Catholic Church (Note: Latin: Ecclesiae Graecae Catholico Macedonica; Macedonian: Македонска грчка католичка црква) or Macedonian Byzantine Catholic Church is a sui juris Eastern Catholic church in full union with the Catholic Church, which uses the Macedonian language in its liturgy. The Macedonian Greek Catholic Church comprises a single eparchy, the Macedonian Catholic Eparchy of the Assumption of the Blessed Virgin Mary in Strumica-Skopje.

== History ==
An apostolic exarch was appointed for Bulgarian Catholic Apostolic Vicariate of Macedonia as early as 1883 and lasting until 1922/1924 as part of the Bulgarian Greek Catholic Church. After the end of World War I and the foundation of Yugoslavia, the Vicariate was absorbed into the Eparchy of Križevci.

In January 2001, a separate Greek Catholic Apostolic Exarchate of Macedonia was formed for Eastern Catholics of the Byzantine Rite in North Macedonia. It was separated from the Eparchy of Križevci and constituted as directly subject to the Holy See. On the same day (11 January 2001), the Holy See appointed the Latin bishop of Skopje as the first Apostolic Exarch of North Macedonia.

== Statistics ==
As of 2017, the church's membership was estimated at approximately 11,374 faithful, with one bishop, 8 parishes, 16 priests, and 18 religious sisters.

Year	Members	Priests	Parishes
2000	10,000	10	8
2001	6,320	9	5
2002	11,000	8	5
2003	11,367	8	5
2004	11,367	9	5
2005	11,398	9	5
2006	11,483	8	5
2007	11,491	8	5
2008	15,175	10	6
2009	15,041	11	7
2010	15,037	11	7
2016	11,336	16	8
2017	11,374	16	8

== Hierarchs ==
Apostolic exarchs

- Lazar Mladenov (1883–1895), Titular bishop of Satala
- Epiphany Shanov (1895–1922 or 1924), Titular bishop of Livias
- Joakim Herbut (2001–2005), Latin Church bishop of Skopje
- Kiro Stojanov (2005–2018), Latin Church bishop of Skopje

Eparchs of Strumica

- Kiro Stojanov (2018–present), Latin Church Bishop of Skopje

== See also ==
- Catholic Church in North Macedonia
