= Joakim Herbut =

Macedonian Catholic prelate (1928–2005)

- Bishop of Skopje
- Native name: Macedonian: Јоаким Хербут; Pannonian Rusyn: Йоаким Гербут; Serbian: Јоаким Хербут
- Church: Catholic Church; Macedonian Greek Catholic Church
- Diocese: Diocese of Skopje
- In office: 2 August 1969 – 15 April 2005
- Predecessor: Smiljan Franjo Čekada
- Successor: Kiro Stojanov
- Other post: Apostolic Exarch of Macedonia (2001-2005)

Orders
- Ordination: 6 July 1952 by Gabrijel Bukatko
- Consecration: 21 December 1969 by Smiljan Franjo Čekada

Personal details
- Born: 14 February 1928 Ruski Krstur, Bačka Oblast, Kingdom of Serbs, Croats and Slovenes
- Died: 15 April 2005 (aged 77) Skopje, Macedonia

Monsignor Dr. Joakim Herbut (Macedonian/Serbian: Јоаким Хербут) 14 February 1928 – 15 April 2005) was a Macedonian Catholic prelate. He was bishop of the Roman Catholic diocese of Skopje-Prizren from 1969 to 2005 and exarch of the Greek Catholic Apostolic Exarch of Macedonia from 2001 to 2005.

Born in the village of Ruski Krstur in present-day Serbia, autonomous province of Vojvodina on 14 February 1928 in the Rusyn family. He was ordained a priest on 6 July 1952 by Bishop Gabrijel Bukatko for the Eparchy of Križevci. Fr. Herbut was the personal assistant in Skopje from 1954 to 1957 and in Križevci from 1957 to 1959. and as bishop of Skopje-Prizren diocese was placed on October 2, 1969 by Pope Paul VI and the inauguration took place on December 21, 1969. Also from 3 July 1972 he served as apostolic visitator for the Byzantine Rite faithful in Yugoslav Macedonia and later he was appointed the head of the renewed Apostolic Exarch of Macedonia on January 11, 2001.

Monsignor Joakim Herbut died in Skopje on April 15, 2005.

Catholic Church titles
Preceded by Smiljan Franjo Čekada	Roman Catholic Bishop of Skopje; 1969–2005 (until 2000 as Roman Catholic Bishop of Skopje-Prizren)	Succeeded by Kiro Stojanov
New title	Greek Catholic Apostolic Exarch of Macedonia; 2001–2005	Succeeded by Kiro Stojanov
