= Macedonian Catholic Eparchy of the Assumption of the Blessed Virgin Mary in Strumica-Skopje =

Greek Catholic eparchy in North Macedonia

Eparchy of the Assumption of the Blessed Virgin Mary in Strumica-Skopje
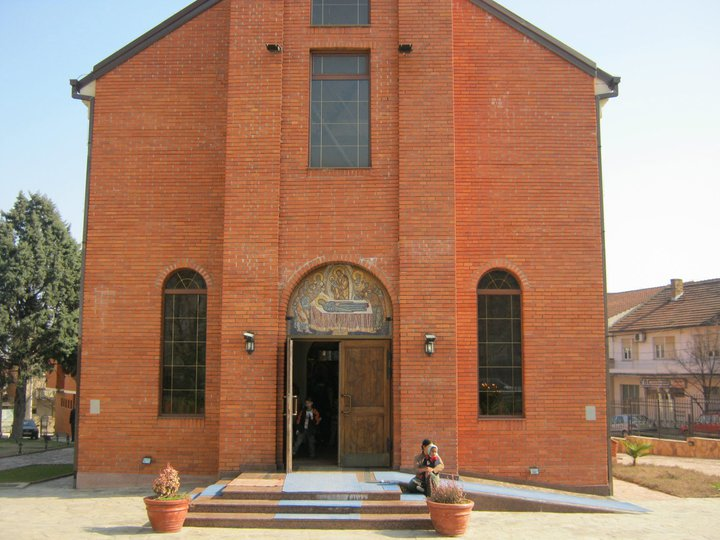
- Cathedral of the Assumption of Blessed Virgin Mary in Strumica

Location
- Country: North Macedonia
- Ecclesiastical province: Immediately subject to the Holy See
- Headquarters: Strumica

Statistics
- Area: 25,713 km^{2} (9,928 sq mi)
- Population: Total; Catholics: (as of 2022); 2,100,000; 11,440 (0.54%)
- Parishes: 9

Information
- Sui iuris church: Macedonian Greek Catholic Church
- Rite: Byzantine
- Established: January 11, 2001
- Cathedral: Cathedral of the Assumption of Blessed Virgin Mary in Strumica
- Patron saint: the Blessed Virgin Mary
- Secular priests: 15
- Language: Macedonian

Current leadership
- Pope: Leo XIV
- Bishop: Kiro Stojanov

Website
- Eparchy of the Blessed Virgin Mary Assumed in Strumica-Skopje

The Macedonian Catholic Eparchy of the Assumption of the Blessed Virgin Mary in Strumica-Skopje is the only eparchy of the Macedonian Greek Catholic Church. It is situated in North Macedonia. The eparchy is an Immediately subject to the Holy See.

== History ==
- January 11, 2001: Established as Apostolic Exarchate of Macedonia for the Macedonians from the Greek Catholic Eparchy of Križevci.
- May 31, 2018: Elevated in the rank of an eparchy (diocese) as the Macedonian Catholic Eparchy of the Assumption of the Blessed Virgin Mary in Strumica-Skopje.

== Eparchial bishops ==
The following is a list of the Apostolic Exarchs and the Eparchial Bishops of the eparchy and their terms of service:

- 11 January 2001 – 15 April 2005: Joakim Herbut, Bishop of Skopje
- since 20 July 2005: Kiro Stojanov, Bishop of Skopje

== See also ==
- Catholic Church in North Macedonia
- Bulgarian Greek Catholic Church
- Greek Catholic Church of Croatia and Serbia
- Albanian Greek Catholic Church
- Greek Byzantine Catholic Church
