= Cathedral of the Assumption of Blessed Virgin Mary, Strumica =

Greek Catholic church in Strumica, North Macedonia

Coordinates: 41.4350°N 22.6400°E

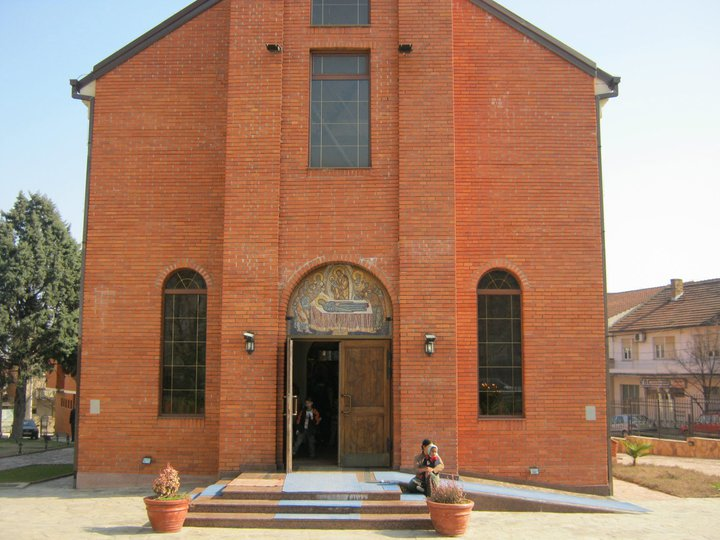

Cathedral of Assumption of Blessed Virgin Mary is a Greek Catholic church in Strumica, North Macedonia, that serves as Cathedral of the Macedonian Catholic Eparchy of Strumica-Skopje, the only eparchy of the Macedonian Greek Catholic Church.

== History ==
The church was built in 1925 for the needs of settlers after the Second Balkan War in 1913 in Strumica, then shortly in Bulgaria, to Bulgarian Uniates and refugees from the vicinity of Kilkis, on the Greek side of the new border. The project leader is Father Athanasius Ivanov. In 1924 the Macedonian Catholics pass under the jurisdiction of the Eparchy of Križevci and in July 1925 Bishop Dionizie Nyaradi blesses the new church. The church was finished in 1931 and consecrated again by Monsignor Nyaradi. In the parish worked other priests: Father Timothy Yanev, Father Nedeljko Stoychev and Father Cyril Avramchev from 1939 to 1944. Father Athanasius was parochial priest in Strumica from 1944 until his death in 1973.
