= Kiro Stojanov =

Macedonian bishop (born 1959)

The Most Reverend Kiro Stojanov
- Bishop of Skopje
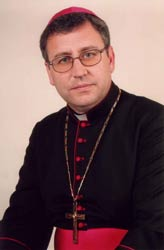
- Diocese: Skopje
- See: Skopje
- Installed: July 20, 2005
- Predecessor: Joakim Herbut
- Other post: Bishop of the Eparchy of Strumica-Skopje (since 2018)
- Previous posts: Apostolic exarch of Macedonia (2005-2018); Titular Bishop of Centuriones (1999-2005); Auxiliary Bishop of Skopje (1999-2005)

Orders
- Ordination: April 6, 1986
- Consecration: May 1, 1999

Personal details
- Born: Kiro Stojanov; April 9, 1959 (age 67) Radovo, Bosilovo Municipality, SFR Yugoslavia
- Denomination: Catholic Church (Latin Church and Macedonian Greek Catholic Church)

Kiro Stojanov (Macedonian: Киро Стојанов; born 9 April 1959) is the Roman Catholic Bishop of Skopje and the Eparchial Bishop of the Macedonian Catholic Eparchy of the Blessed Virgin Mary Assumed in Strumica-Skopje of the Macedonian Greek Catholic Church.

He currently also serves as president of Macedonian Caritas.

== Biography ==
In 2005, he succeeded Joakim Herbut as both Roman Catholic Bishop of Skopje and Apostolic exarch of Macedonia, becoming the head of the Macedonian Greek Catholic Church. On 31 May 2018, the apostolic exarchate was elevated to the rank of an eparchy (diocese) as the Macedonian Catholic Eparchy of the Blessed Virgin Mary Assumed in Strumica-Skopje, of which Stojanov became the first eparch.

== Bibliography ==
- Kiro Stojanov: Dialogue based on the foundations that connect us. A contribution toward strengthening relations among the churches and religious communities in Macedonia. In: Journal of Ecumenical Studies 39(2002), Nr. 1-2, S. 73-76.
- Neue Malteser in Makedonien aufgenommen. In: Malteser Kreuz 2003, Heft 3/4.
