= Caritas Kosova =

Kosovar social service provider and relief organisation

Caritas Kosovo
- Caritas Kosova
- Established: 1992
- Type: Nonprofit
- Legal status: Association
- Location: Ferizaj, Kosovo
- Coordinates: 42.3661°N 21.1597°E
- Origins: Catholic Social Teaching
- Region served: Kosovo
- Fields: social work, humanitarian relief
- President: Dodë Gjergji
- Affiliations: Caritas Internationalis, Caritas Europa
- Budget: €4,413,969 (2021)
- Staff: 800 (2017)
- Volunteers: 400 (2017)
- Website: www.caritaskosova.org/en
- Formerly called: Kosovar Catholic Church Caritas

Caritas Kosovo (Albanian: Caritas Kosova) is a Kosovar Catholic not-for-profit organisation. It is a member of both Caritas Europa and Caritas Internationalis.

== Background ==
Caritas Kosova was founded in 1992 as a Catholic initiative to support the local population experiencing rampant poverty, primarily through the distribution of humanitarian aid. At the time, it was not officially registered as an NGO. After the Kosovo War (1998–1999), various agencies from the global Caritas confederation became active in the country. Caritas Kosova then developed as an emergency relief actor, receiving funding and technical support from Caritas agencies in Caritas Belgium, France, Germany, Italy, Spain, Switzerland, the United States, and other countries.

Over the years, Caritas Kosova expanded its presence across the country and broadened its range of activities. As of 2024, the organisation has its headquarters in Ferizaj, with regional offices in Pristina, Prizren, Gjakova, Mitrovica, and Leposavić, while implementing activities in numerous other cities and villages. Despite being a Catholic organisation, Caritas Kosova works with various communities in the country without ethnic or religious discrimination. It is one of the few organisations active in both Albanian and Serbian-dominated parts of Kosovo, as well as with other minorities such as Roma, Ashkali and Balkan Egyptians.

In the immediate aftermath of the Kosovo war, multiple other member organisations of the Caritas Internationalis confederation operated in Kosovo, often supporting Caritas Kosovo. At the height of the emergency response, the American Catholic Relief Services had more than 400 staff in Kosovo. As of 2024, Caritas Switzerland still operates in Kosovo with its own office and staff, which has led to disputes with Caritas Kosovo.

== Work ==
Caritas Kosovo started as a humanitarian relief agency involved in distributions and other activities, then worked with internally displaced persons and returnees after the war. Over time, it expanded its sectors of work to become a social service provider. The organisation has signed cooperation agreements with various regional and State authorities, including different municipality and ministries such as the Ministry of Labour and Social Welfare, the Ministry of Health, and the Ministry of Education, Science and Technology, and the University of Gjakova.

Since the end of the Kosovo War, Caritas Kosova has been active in diverse sectors such as psychosocial support and mental health, labour market integration, rehabilitation and socio-economic reintegration of prisoners, support to persons with disability, social assistance for families living in extreme poverty, and childcare An important sector of work is that of healthcare and home care.

== Photos ==
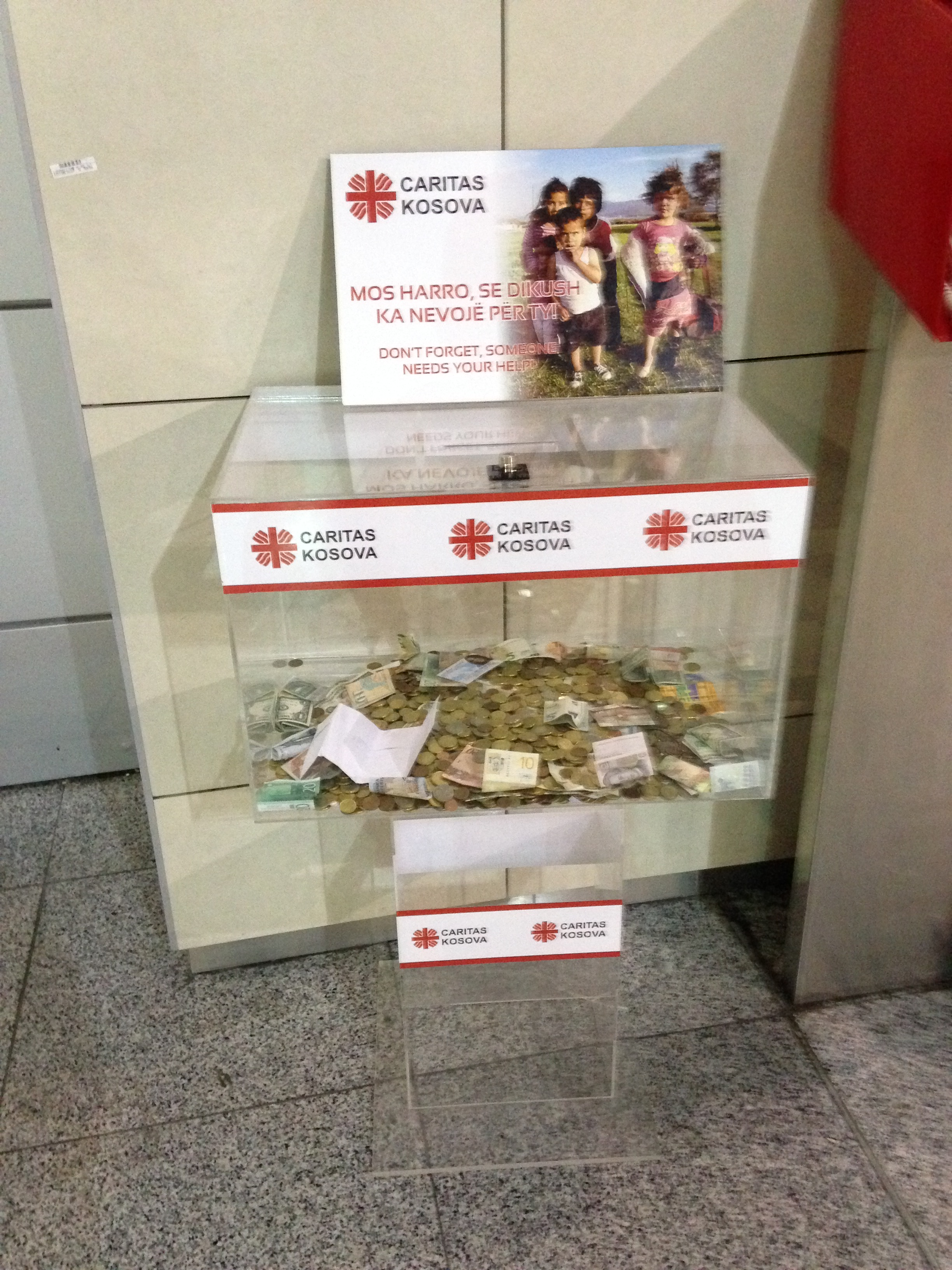
Donation box for Caritas Kosova in Pristina International Airport in 2016

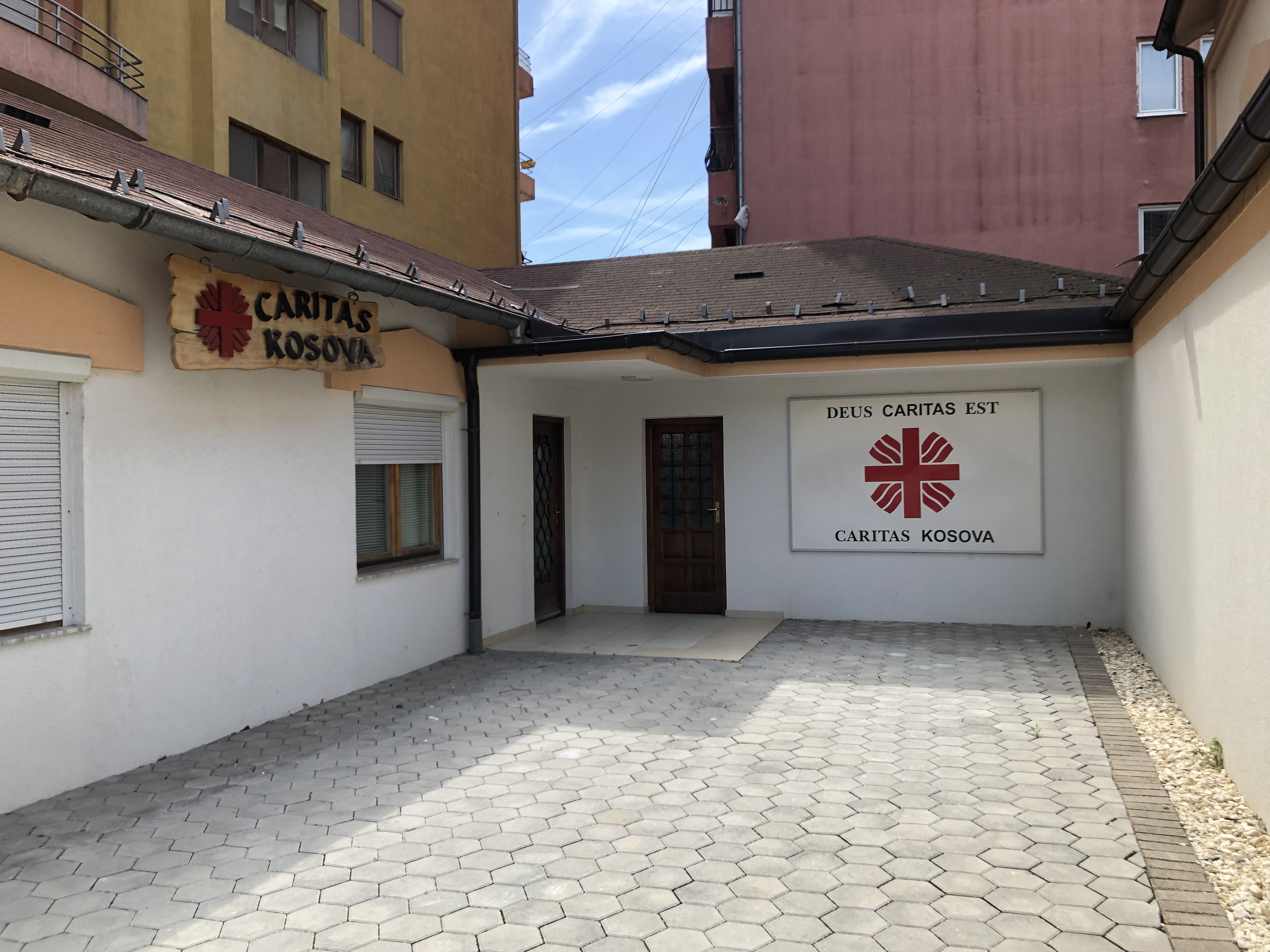
Entrance to the Caritas Kosova head office in Ferizaj

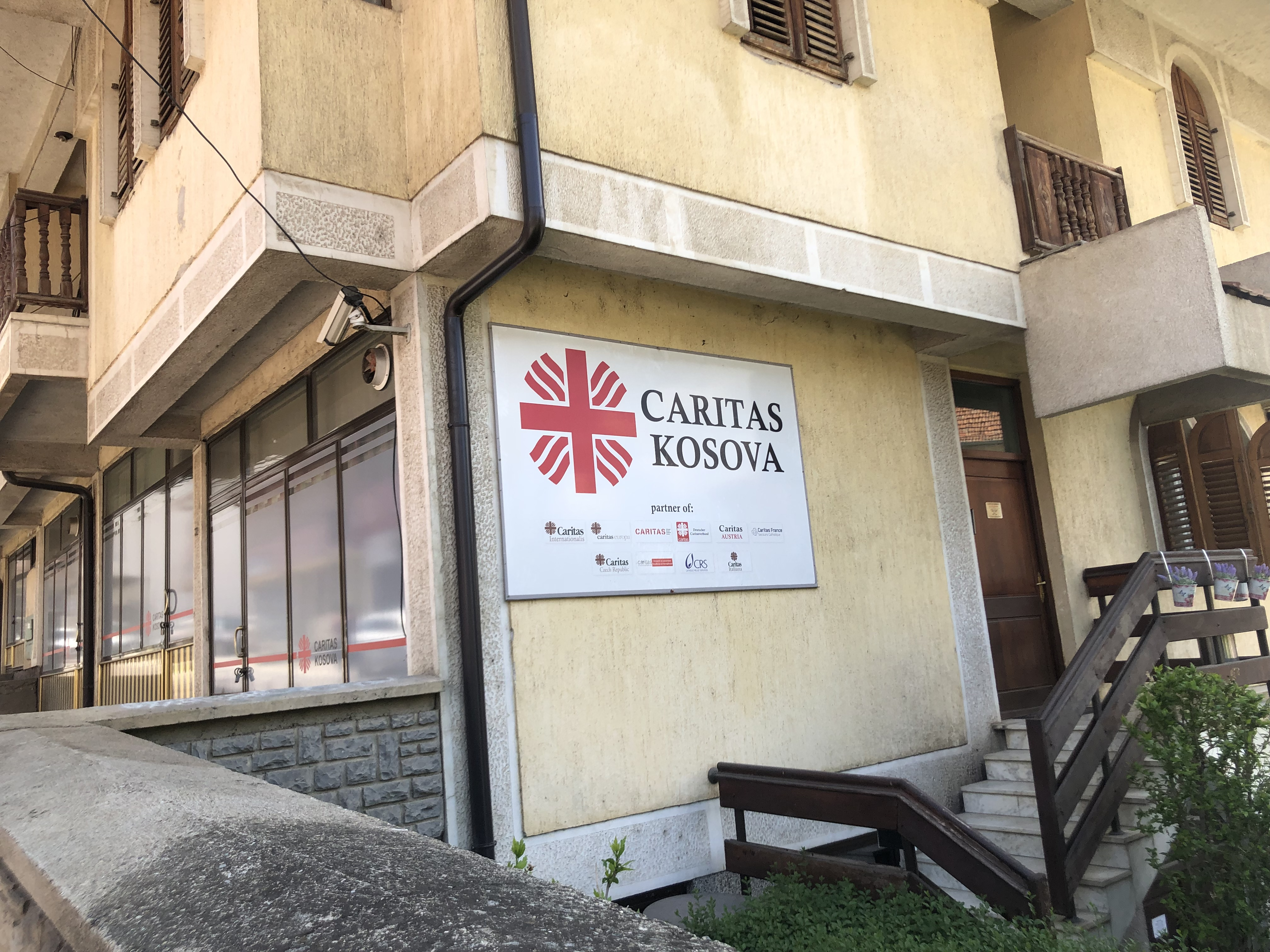
Caritas office in Prizren
