= Pastificio Futuro =

Italian pasta company

- Pastificio Futuro
- Formation: 2023
- Founded at: Rome
- Type: Charitable
- Purpose: Rehabilitation of juvenile offenders
- Products: Pasta
- Website: pastificiofuturo.it

Pastificio Futuro is an Italian pasta maker.

The factory is located within Rome's Juvenile Penile Institute of Casal del Marmo (Casal del Marmo) juvenile prison and employs inmates and former inmates of the prison. It is a project of the social cooperative Gustolibero Società Cooperativa Sociale Onlus (Gustolibero Onlu) working with CEI and Caritas Italiana. It started production in 2023 and produces ten varieties of pasta. Each bag carries a quote from Pope Francis, "Non lasciatevi rubare la speranza" (Don't let your hope be stolen), which Francis said in a homily delivered in 2013 to inmates.

Francis celebrated his first Mass of the Lord's Supper on Holy Thursday in 2013 at the prison. He visited again that year for a foot-washing ceremony. Francis along with the Italian Episcopal Conference provided the initial funding for the project. Francis returned in 2023 for another foot-washing ceremony.

Before he died, Francis donated €200,000, the entire contents of his personal bank account, to the project.
