= Caritas Estonia =

Catholic charity organization based in Estonia

- Caritas Eesti
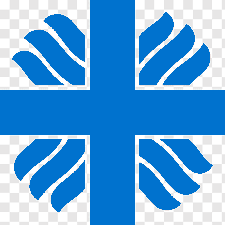
- Established: 1996; 30 years ago (founded); 26 March 1997; 29 years ago (registered)
- Type: Mittetulundusühing (Non-profit association)
- Location: Tallinn, Estonia
- Region served: Estonia
- Official language: Estonian
- Affiliations: Caritas Europa, Caritas Internationalis
- Website: www.caritas.ee
- Formerly called: Eesti Caritas

Caritas Estonia (Estonian: Caritas Eesti) is a non-profit association in Estonia.

It is affiliated with the Catholic Church in Estonia and part of the Caritas Internationalis confederation and the regional Caritas Europa.

== History ==
After the restoration of independence of Estonia in 1991, a large number of vulnerable people were in need of assistance. Starting in 1992, Caritas Germany sent packages for humanitarian aid. A local Tartu Caritas was founded to distribute this aid. In 1996 activist and politician Lagle Parek set up the national Caritas Estonia, which was not formally registered as an NGO until 26 March 1997 The initial name was Eesti Caritas; this was changed to Caritas Eesti in 2003.

Among the first activities was the distribution of clothes and food to children from families in difficulty and without family support. Soon afterwards, the first day centres were established, named Caritas Kinderstubed. They provided food, education and other care to vulnerable children. The Caritas Kinderstubed started operating in Narva, Ahtme and Tartu in 1997.

After this, integration projects for children and young people were set up, bringing together children and young people who speak Estonian and other languages (mainly Russian) as their mother tongue, in different ways, for common discussions and common goals.

1997 also saw the birth of Caritas' long-running project, the "Estonian Farm Teaches Estonian" (Eesti talu õpetab eesti keelt), which has seen more than 1,000 children learning the Estonian language, culture and traditions in Estonian farms during school holidays. Between 2000 and 2003, Caritas offered farm holidays and farm education primarily to children from children's homes in Ida-Viru County and to children from families with coping difficulties in Tallinn.

In 1998, director Merle Karusoo and young people from Viljandi Culture Academy carried out a project entitled "Who I am" (Kes ma olen) for 87 Russian-speaking young people, during which the young people searched for their roots and identity under the guidance of the director and with the help of creative techniques. The project resulted in a series of productions that explored the connections between different people and their roots, social and cultural affiliations.

In 1999, the project "Theatre and Dance for Social Change" (Teater ja tants sotsiaalsete muutuste teenistuses), funded by the Estonian Centre for Contemporary Art and the European Cultural Foundation, was launched to address the problems of children and young people and to find solutions through artistic activities involving actors and dancers in solving the problems of children and young people. In Tallinn, a Caritas youth arts and theatre project was launched, and in Tartu, creative dance classes were held for the children of the Caritas Kinderstubed project.

In 1999, a project called "Democracy School" (Demokraatiakool) took place, where young people of different nationalities debated all the issues that concern them, from the social system to agricultural policy. In 2000, the joint project "From Border to Border" (Piirist piirini) in Narva and Häädemeeste and the project "New Life in Narva-Jõesuu" (Uus elu Narva-Jõesuus) tried to enhance the value of Narva-Jõesuu, the home town.

In 1999, Caritas Estonia became a member of Caritas Europa.

By the autumn of 2001, the Caritas School of Creativity had grown out of the theatre and art classes for young people in Tallinn, and began to operate in the newly completed premises of the new Pirita Monastery. The aim of the Creativity School was to increase tolerance through creativity between different social groups and to discover oneself and the world through artistic activities. Through creativity, children can express their feelings and opinions, learn to communicate with their peers, respect others and feel that they belong. This method has been widely appreciated worldwide, especially when working with children at risk, and has received a lot of positive feedback. To promote integration, in 2001 Estonian and Russian young people jointly renovated the Caritas eco-house in Sillamäe, also learning the ecological technologies used. The international dimension was added in 2001 by a joint camp for French and Estonian children in Soomaa.

In 2002, camps continued in Ida-Viru County and children's school holidays on farms.

In 2003, Caritas started to work with girls who had been orphaned as teenagers - the first support group started. It started to look for ways to support girls who had become mothers at a very young age to cope, to parent, to learn skills and responsibilities. The work with young mothers has received extremely positive feedback and continues to evolve and develop to this day.

In July 2003, during its 17th General Assembly, Caritas Estonia was admitted as member of Caritas Internationalis.

In 2005, the Caritas Family Centre (Caritase perekeskus) was opened in the Kopli district of Tallinn. The centre was initially intended primarily for families with young children living in the northern part of Tallinn, but also for other Caritas target groups and anyone interested. In 2006, we continued to develop hobby groups in the family centre, to work with young mothers, and to do guardianship work.

In 2007, the Foundation for Foster Children was added (Asenduskodulaste fond). The fund aims to develop the horizons of children in care and to provide meaningful leisure activities by supporting participation in recreational activities and class excursions, as well as participation in training courses for up to one year.

In 2008, a school for young mothers was launched in Pärnu.

From 2005 to 2017, the Caritas Family Centre and the Young Mothers' School in Põhja-Tallinn were open for children to take part in a variety of activities and support groups for young parents. From 2009 to 2015, the Caritas Family Centre provided childcare and support services to inactive and working young parents up to 24 years of age.

Since 2017, the Caritas School for Young Mothers has been operating in the Pirita Convent, providing socio-educational family counselling for young parents (including teenagers, young parents with intellectual disabilities) and running support groups for young parents.
