= Willy Geysen =

Willy Geysen is the head of the Centre for Intellectual Property Rights (CIR) at the Katholieke Universiteit Leuven and was President of Caritas Catholica Flanders from 1996 until 2008, when he was succeeded by Guido Van Oevelen.

== Education ==
He graduated as an industrial engineer in electro-mechanics at the Hoger Rijksinstituut voor Technisch Onderwijs en Kernenergiebedrijven (E: Polytechnic College for Nuclear energy) in Mol (Belgium). In addition het obtained a certificate for technological teaching at the Technical Teaching College in Hasselt (Belgium). In 1969 he graduated as a candidate fire-officer (Hasselt and Antwerp).

In 1970, he obtained a PhD in applied sciences at the Katholieke Universiteit Leuven with a thesis on the Calculation of the magnetic field in a cross section and the induction in the air gap of an induction motor, taken into account the saturation, the teeth effect and the real current distribution. From the Central State Examination Committee he obtained a law degree in 1980.

== Career ==
He was chairman of the Power Division at the Electrical Engineering Department (Engineering Faculty) of the Katholieke Universiteit Leuven from 1975 until 1993. He acted as coordinator of the Postgraduate programme on Safety Engineering at the university from 1975 until 1990. His research at the university focussed on the causes of fire and explosions and with the influence of standards and regulations. He also did research on energy fluxes and on field calculations in electrical machines.

== Sources ==
- Professor ir. Willy Geysen
- 75ème anniversaire de Caritas en Belgique (French)
- Voorzitterswissel Caritas Vlaanderen (Dutch)
- Nieuwe voorzitter Caritas Vlaanderen (Dutch)
