= Caritas Europa =

European confederation of Catholic social service providers and relief organisations

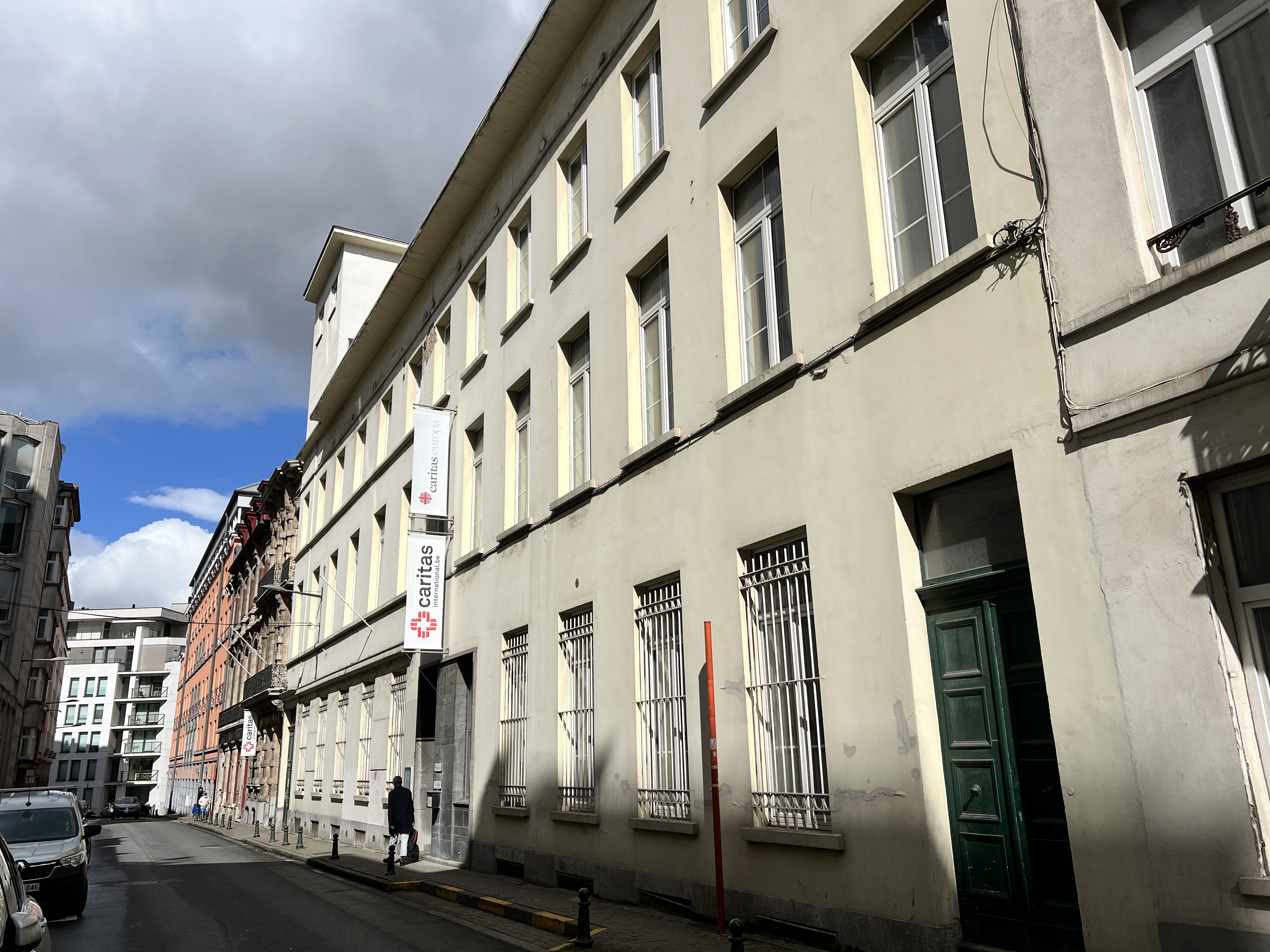
- Office of Caritas Europa in Saint-Josse-ten-Noode, Brussels
- Abbreviation: CE
- Established: 19 July 1993
- Purpose: Humanitarian aid, International development and social service
- Location: Brussels, Belgium
- Coordinates: 50.8473883°N 4.3703264°E
- Region served: Europe
- Secretary General: Maria Nyman
- President: Michael Landau
- Vice-President: Tetiana Stawnychy
- Main organ: General Assembly, Executive Board
- Parent organization: Caritas Internationalis
- Revenue: €2,232,472 (2022)
- Expenses: €2,238,756 (2022)
- Staff: 18 (secretariat) (2022)
- Website: caritas.eu
- Formerly called: Euro-Caritas (1985-1993)

Caritas Europa is a European confederation of Catholic social service providers and international development and humanitarian relief organisations operating in Europe. It is one of the seven regions of Caritas Internationalis.

Caritas Europa refers to both the European network with its 49 member organisations, and its secretariat based in Brussels, Belgium.

== History ==
Caritas Germany, established in 1897, was the first Caritas organisation. Over the following decades, numerous other Caritas organisations emerged in other countries. Caritas Internationalis, the global Confederation of all national Caritas organisations, was founded in 1950 in Rome. Its European members worked together as the informal "European region" of Caritas Internationalis and starting in 1966 met every two years. Cooperation and collaboration increased throughout the 1970s and 1980s, especially after the creation of the European Economic Community (EEC). The EEC administration insisted on working with a unique interlocutor instead of individual NGOs. For this reason, the Caritas network in Europe and other NGOs created the NGO Euronaid in 1980, particularly for the distribution of food aid by the EEC.

In the 1980s, European Caritas organisations recognized an increasing need for a pan-European Caritas structure. Rather than establishing a formal legal entity, they opted to have European member organisations collaborate through consortia with varying memberships tailored to different areas of work. For instance, one consortium focused on providing aid in Poland, while another implemented programmes in Russia, and so forth. This collaborative model was endorsed during its general assembly, formally called "Regional Conference", of the European members of Caritas Internationalis in Luxembourg in May 1985. This new cooperation model was named Euro-Caritas and was overseen by Caritas Belgium in Brussels. Edward de Brandt was appointed as its Managing Director and served in that capacity until 1992. Euro-Caritas was mostly an initiative of the Caritas organisations based in the European Economic Community, the predecessor of the European Union.

At the same time, between 1983 and 1991, the name Caritas Europa was used as the working title for the European region of Caritas Internationalis. This structure continued its work also outside of the European Economic Community, such as with the Council of Europe.

After the fall of the Berlin Wall and the end of communism, numerous new Caritas organisations emerged in central and eastern European nations. At the regional conference of the European region of Caritas Internationalis in Vienna, in 1991, Luc Trouillard of Caritas France was elected as Secretary-General and Msgr. William Kenney from Sweden was elected as President.

In July 1993, Caritas Europa was formally established as a non-profit association under Belgian law with its secretariat based in Brussels. Until then, the secretariat had been located in Lucerne in the premises of Caritas Switzerland. This new legal framework consolidated the former Euro-Caritas structures and the European region of Caritas Internationalis into a unified entity. In 2015, the Caritas Europa secretariat moved its office into the same building as Caritas International Belgium in Saint-Josse-ten-Noode, Brussels.

== Work ==
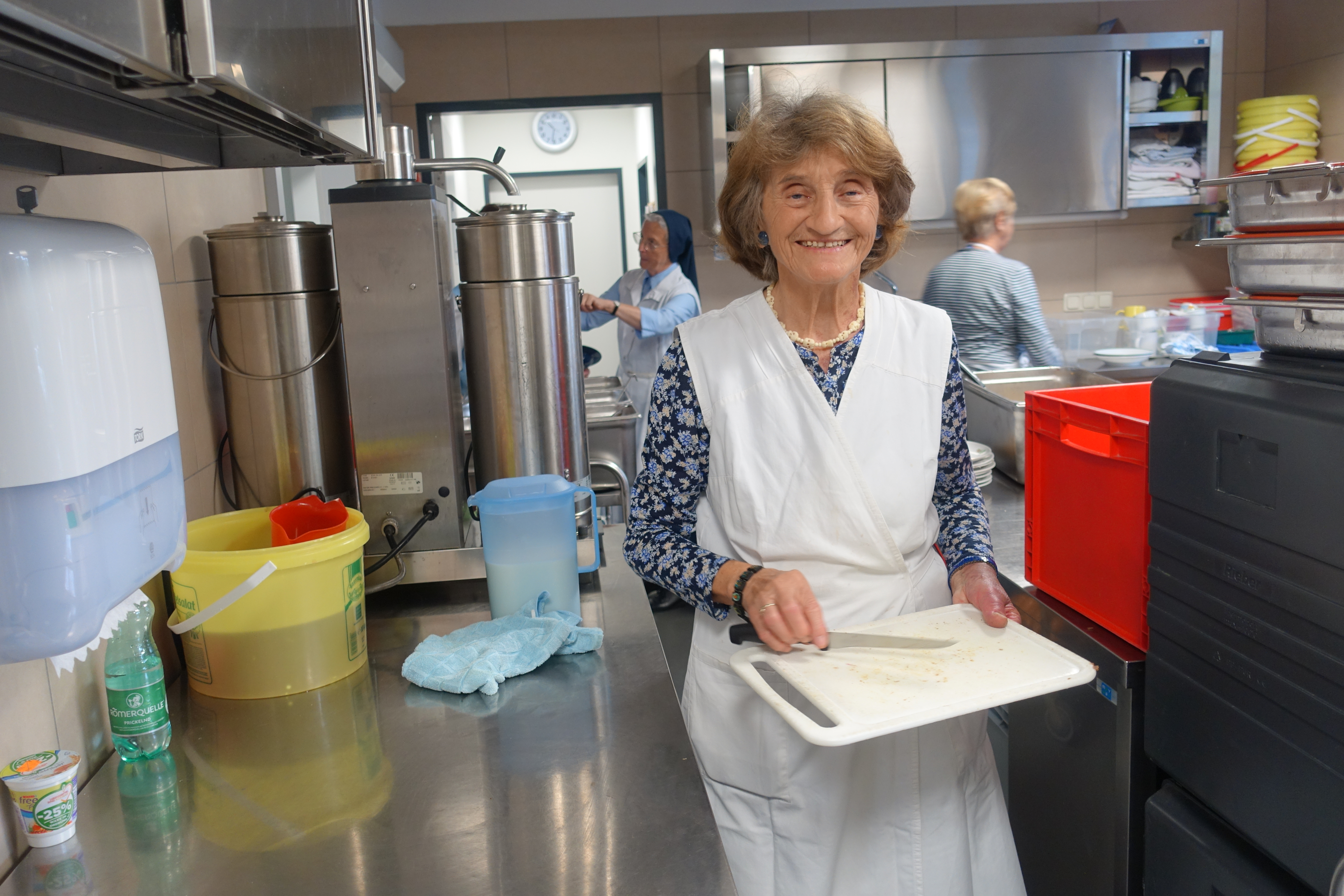
An Austrian Caritas volunteer supporting in the preparation and distribution of food in Graz.

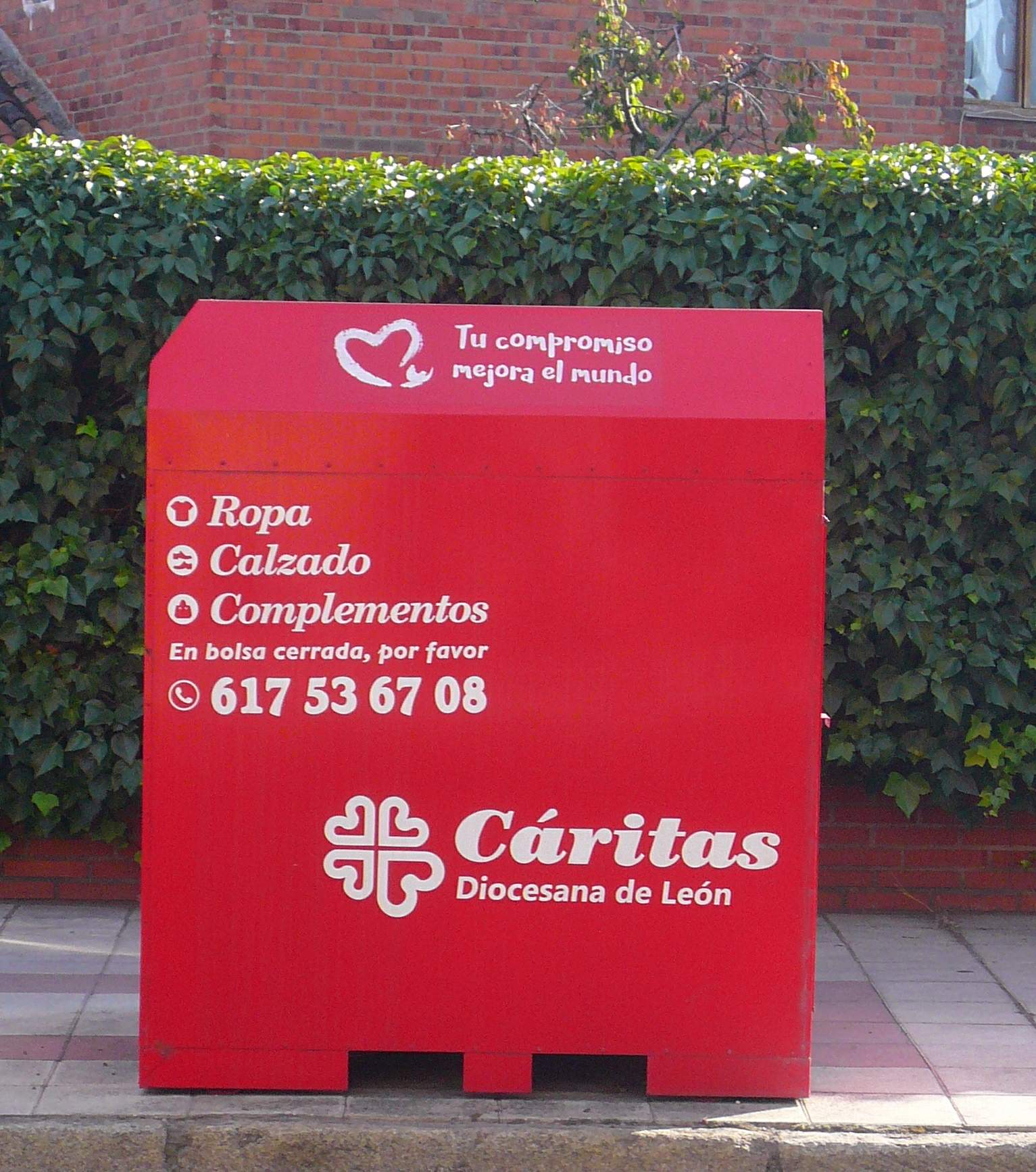
Textitle collection box from Caritas Spain in San Andrés del Rabanedo.

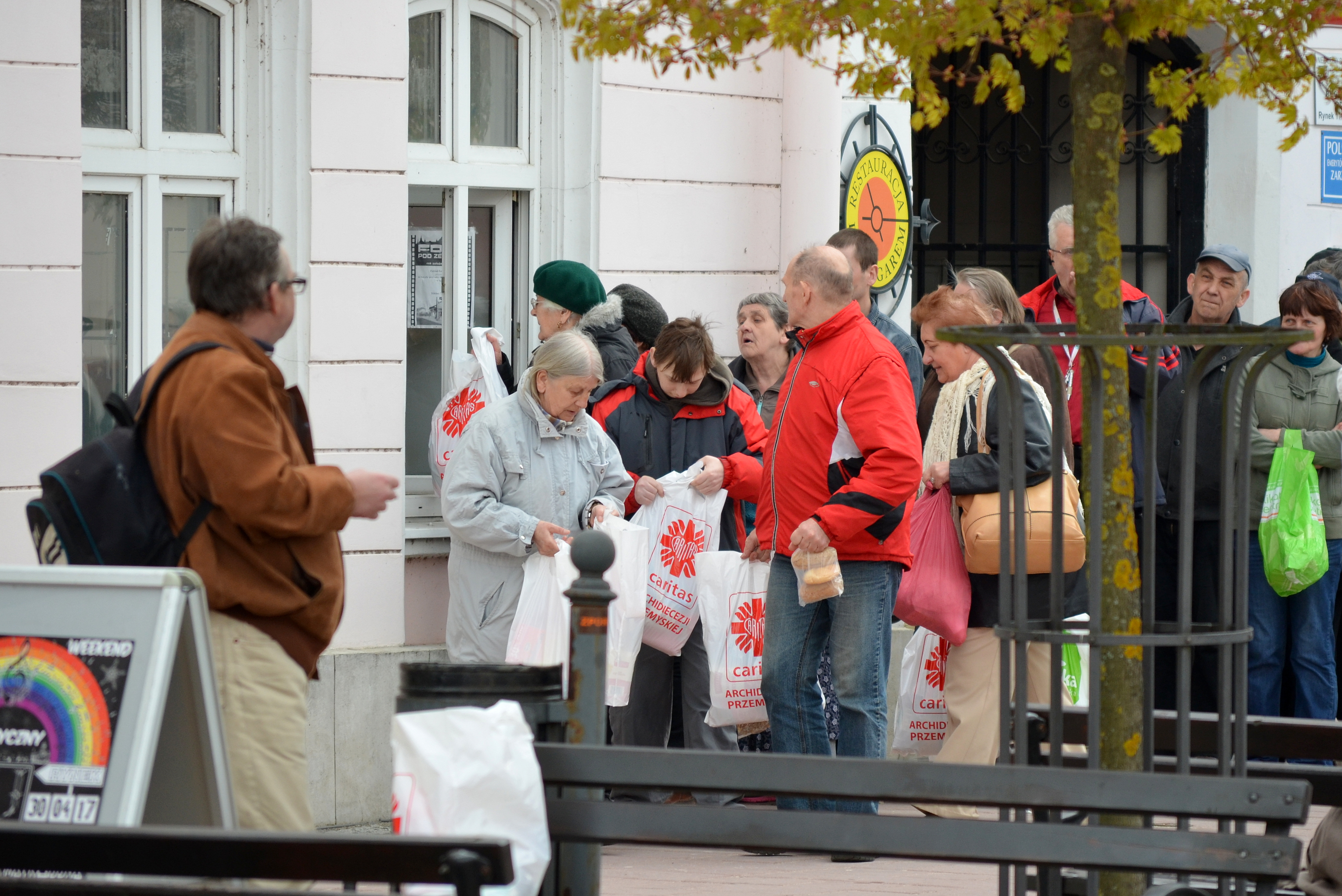
Caritas Poland distributing bags with food in Sanok.

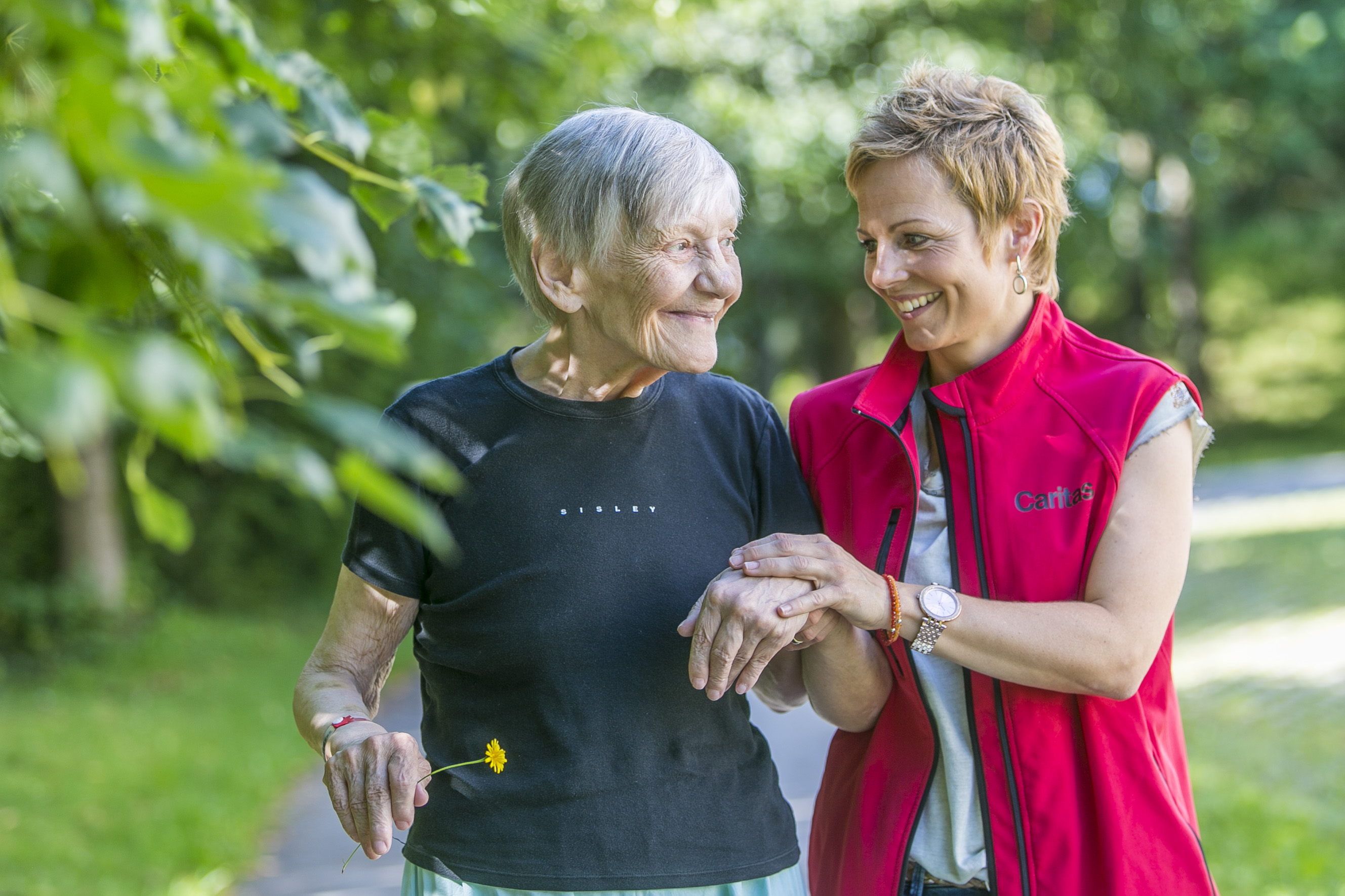
An Austrian Caritas worker visiting a patient in the geriatric ward of a hospital in Salzburg.

Caritas Europa consists of 49 national member organisations that are working in 46 European countries. The member organisations are active in combating poverty and social exclusion, providing social and welfare services, dealing with migration and asylum issues, combating human trafficking, providing humanitarian aid in Europe and across the world, regional development, peace programmes and projects around the world. Caritas Europa fosters cooperation and mutual learning among its member organisations and facilitates capacity building, joint advocacy and joint projects and programmes.

The secretariat, headquartered in Brussels, employs staff engaged in advocacy activities targeting the European Union, the Council of Europe, and their respective member states. They focus on policy issues concerning poverty, social inequality, migration, asylum, emergency humanitarian assistance, and international development globally.

Caritas Europa is affiliated with a range of other platforms, including the European development NGO network CONCORD, the European humanitarian NGO network VOICE, the social and healthcare organisation network Social Services Europe, the European Council on Refugees and Exiles and others. Caritas Europa states that it maintains a "privileged partnership" with the Council of the Bishops' Conferences of Europe (CCEE), the Commission of the Bishops' Conferences of the European Union (COMECE) and CIDSE, an umbrella organisation for Catholic development agencies from Europe and North America.

== Membership ==
Over the years, the number of member organisations has continuously increased. As of 2024, Caritas Europa consists of 49 national member organisations operating in 46 European countries, covering every European Union and Council of Europe member state, as well as Belarus, Kosovo and Russia.

In certain countries, multiple Caritas member organisations exist. For example, Ukraine has Caritas Ukraine (Greek-Catholic bishops' initiative) and Caritas-Spes (Roman Catholic bishops' initiative). In the United Kingdom, there are three Caritas organisations: CAFOD for international programmes and CSAN for national social programmes, while SCIAF serves as the national Caritas organisation in Scotland. Northern Ireland is covered by Trócaire, the Irish member. Because Caritas Europa adheres to the structure of the Catholic Church, Caritas Cyprus is not affiliated with Caritas Europa, although Cyprus is an EU member state. Instead, Caritas Cyprus is part of another region within Caritas Internationalis known as Caritas Middle East and North Africa (Caritas MONA).

National Caritas organisations are the members of Caritas Europa. In most countries, each national organisation serves as an umbrella for various diocesan Caritas organisations. Diocesan and parish Caritas groups operate locally but are not direct members of Caritas Europa.

Membership activities vary widely. Some organisations focus solely on domestic social welfare (e.g., Caritas Moldova or Caritas Montenegro), while others specialize in international development and humanitarian aid (e.g., Cordaid, CAFOD). Some organisations engage in both domestic and international activities (e.g., Caritas Spain, Caritas Germany, Caritas Poland).

Certain member organisations working internationally act as "partnership organisations", supporting local partners abroad without direct implementation. Examples include Caritas Portugal and Caritas Denmark. Others, like Caritas Czech Republic and Caritas Switzerland, establish offices in third countries to directly manage humanitarian and development projects.

As Caritas Europa is one of the seven regions of Caritas Internationalis, all members of Caritas Europa are also members of Caritas Internationalis.

=== List of member organisations ===
Country	Member organisation (English name)	Member organisation (Local name)	Established
Albania	Caritas Albania	Caritas Shqiptar	1993
Andorra	Caritas Andorra	Càritas Andorrana	1993
Armenia	Armenian Caritas	Հայկական Կարիտաս	1995
Austria	Caritas Austria	Caritas Österreich	1903
Azerbaijan	Caritas Azerbaijan (Note: Caritas Azerbaijan and Caritas Kosovo are only corresponding member.)	Karitas Azərbaycanda	?
Belarus	Caritas Belarus	Дабрачыннае каталіцкае таварыства Карытас	1990
Belgium	Caritas in Belgium (Note: Caritas in Belgium does not legally exist but is an umbrella for Caritas Flanders (Caritas Vlaanderen), Caritas in French- & German-speaking Belgium (Caritas francophone), and Caritas International.)	Caritas en Belgique, Caritas in België	1949
Bosnia and Herzegovina	Caritas Bosnia and Herzegovina	Caritas Bosne i Hercegovine	1995
Bulgaria	Caritas Bulgaria	Каритас България	1993
Croatia	Caritas Croatia	Hrvatski Caritas	1992
Czech Republic	Caritas Czech Republic	Charita Česká republika	1928
Denmark	Caritas Denmark	Caritas Danmark	1947
Estonia	Caritas Estonia	Caritas Eesti	1997
Finland	Caritas Finland	Suomen Caritas	1960
France	Caritas France	Secours catholique	1946
Georgia	Caritas Georgia	საქართველოს კარიტასი	1994
Germany	Caritas Germany	Deutscher Caritasverband	1897
Greece	Caritas Hellas	Κάριτας Ελλάς	1976
Hungary	Caritas Hungary	Katolikus Karitász / Caritas Hungarica	1931
Iceland	Caritas Iceland	—	1989
Ireland	Trócaire (Note: CAFOD, Cordaid, Trócaire, and SCIAF only work internationally (abroad).)	—	1973
Italy	Caritas Italy	Caritas Italiana	1971
Kosovo	Caritas Kosovo	Caritas Kosova	1992
Latvia	Caritas Latvia	Caritas Latvija	2004
Lithuania	Caritas Lithuania	Lietuvos Caritas	1926
Luxembourg	Caritas Luxembourg	—	1932
North Macedonia	Macedonian Caritas	Македонски Каритас / Makedonski Karitas	1993
Malta	Caritas Malta	—	1965
Moldova	Caritas Moldova	—	1995
Monaco	Caritas Monaco	—	1990
Montenegro	Caritas Montenegro	Caritas Crne Gore	1979
Netherlands	Cordaid	—	2000
Norway	Caritas Norway	Caritas Norge	1952
Poland	Caritas Poland	Caritas Polska	1990
Portugal	Caritas Portugal	Cáritas Portuguesa	1956
Romania	Caritas Romania	Confederația Caritas România	1994
Russia	Caritas Russia	Каритас Россия	1991
Serbia	Caritas Serbia	Caritas Srbije	1995
Slovakia	Caritas Slovakia	Slovenská katolícka charita	1927
Slovenia	Caritas Slovenia	Slovenska karitas	1995
Spain	Caritas Spain	Cáritas Española	1947
Sweden	Caritas Sweden	Caritas Sverige	1946
Switzerland	Caritas Switzerland	Caritas Schweiz, Caritas Suisse, Caritas Svizerra, Caritas Svizra	1901
Turkey	Caritas Turkey	Caritas Türkiye	1951
Ukraine	Caritas Ukraine (Note: Caritas Ukraine is the Caritas of the Greek Catholic rite, while Caritas-Spes Ukraine is the Caritas of the Roman Catholic rite.)	Карітас України	1992
Ukraine	Caritas-Spes Ukraine	Карітас-Спес	1991
United Kingdom: England and Wales	CAFOD	—	1960
United Kingdom: England and Wales	Caritas Social Action Network (CSAN)	—	2003
United Kingdom: Scotland	SCIAF	—	1965

== Executive leadership ==
=== Presidents ===
The position of President of Caritas Europa was established in 1992, just before the network was legally created. Prior to 1992, the official title was Vice-President of Caritas Internationalis – Regio Europa.

- 1961–1965: Jacques de Bourbon-Busset
- 1965–1969: Abramo Freschi
- 1969–1972: Leopold Ungar
- 1972–1975: Juan Antonio Masip Pinilla
- 1975–1983: Louis Gaben
- 1983–1991: Fridolin Kissling
- 1991–1999: Msgr. William Kenney
- 1999–2005: Denis Viénot
- 2005–2007: Cristina Loghin
- 2007–2015: Fr. Erny Gillen
- 2015–2020: Msgr. Luc Van Looy
- 2020 – present: Fr. Michael Landau

=== General Secretaries ===
- 1983–1991: Walter E. Laetsch
- 1985–1992: Edward de Brandt (Managing Director of Euro-Caritas)
- 1991–1995: Luc Trouillard
- 1996–2002: Hermann Icking
- 2002–2010: Marius Wanders
- 2010–2019: Jorge Nuño Mayer
- 2019 – present: Maria Nyman

== Selected photos and videos ==
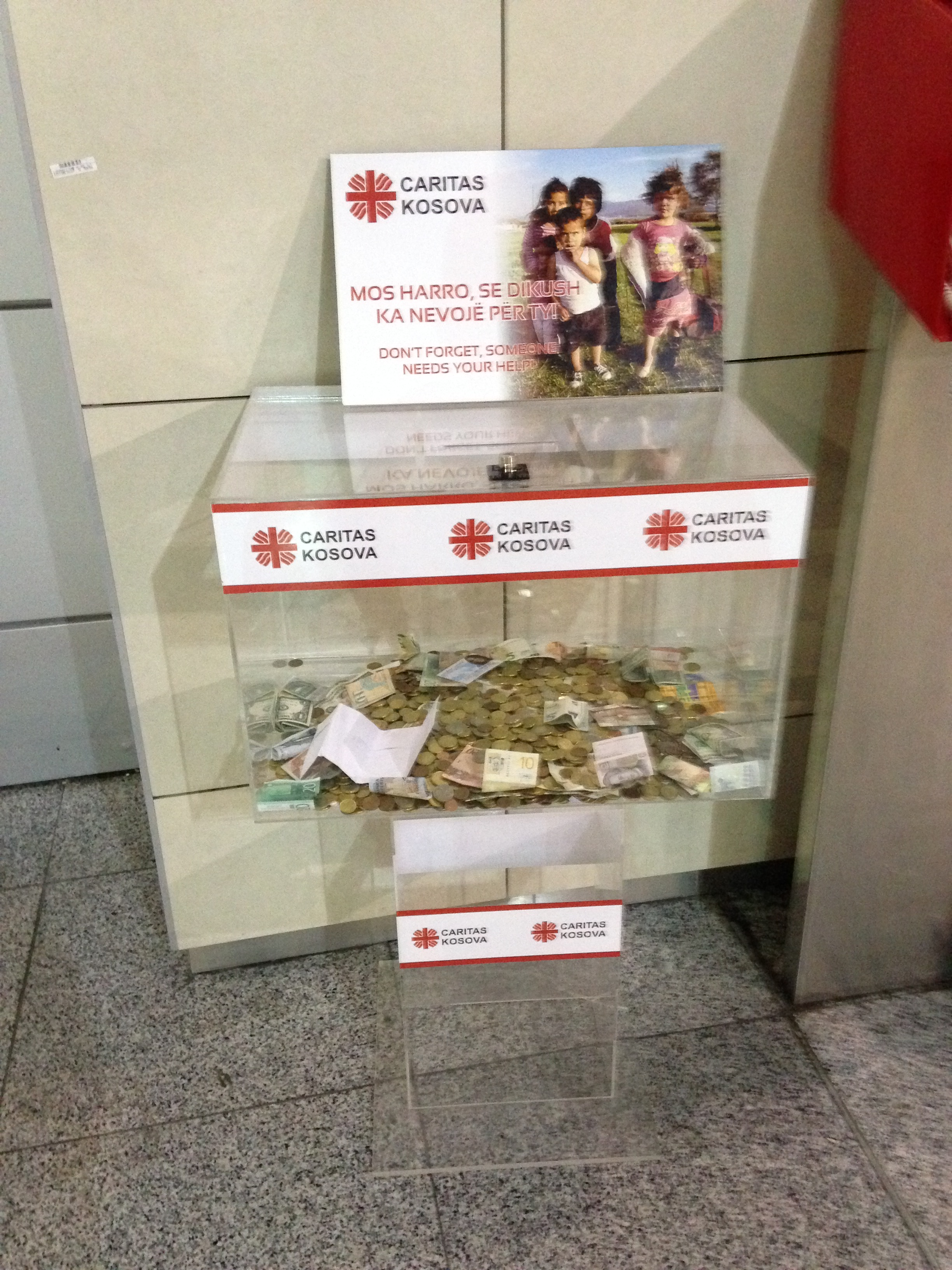
Donation box of Caritas Kosovo in Pristina International Airport.

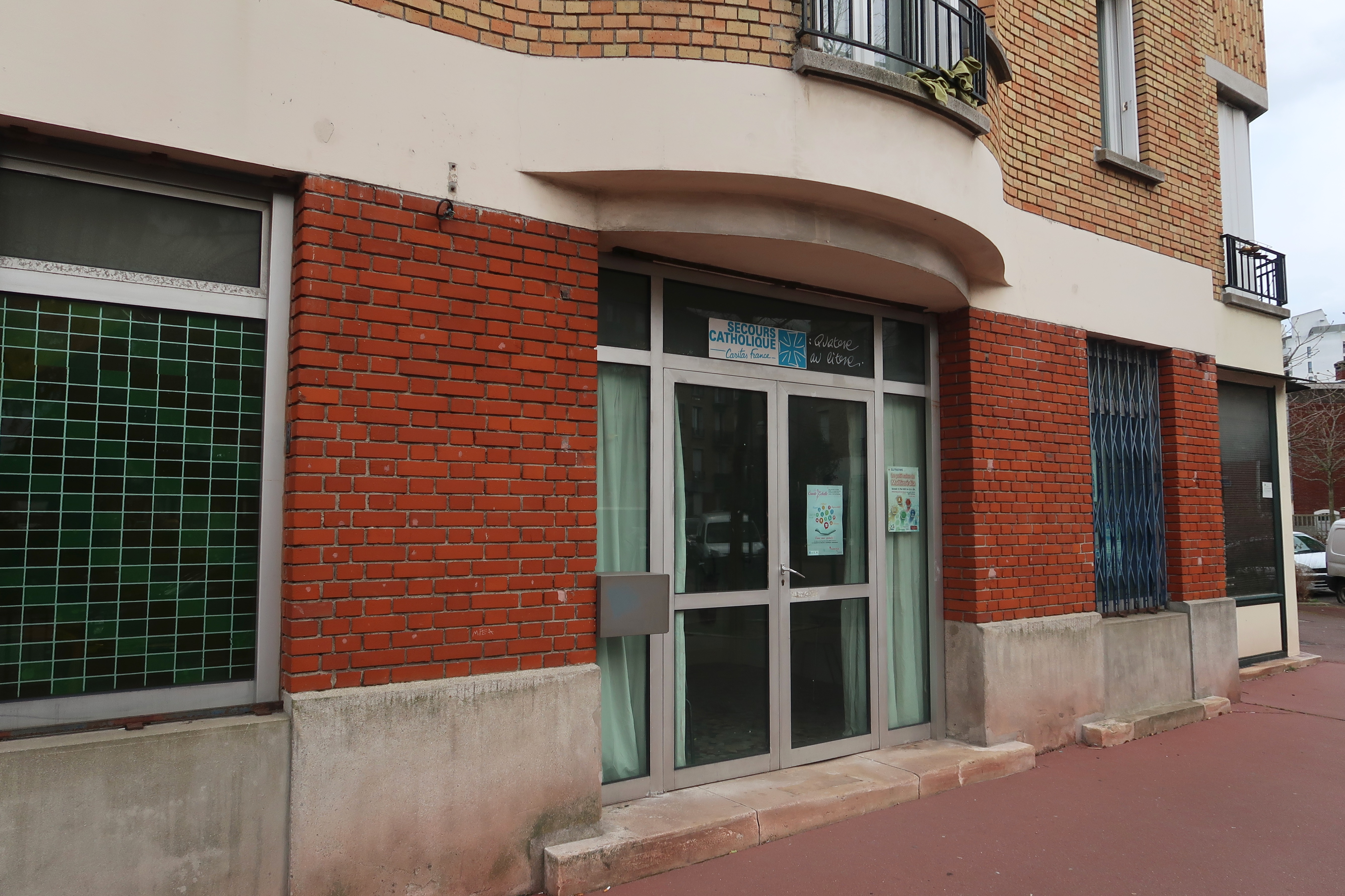
Presence of Secours catholique (Caritas France) in Suresnes.

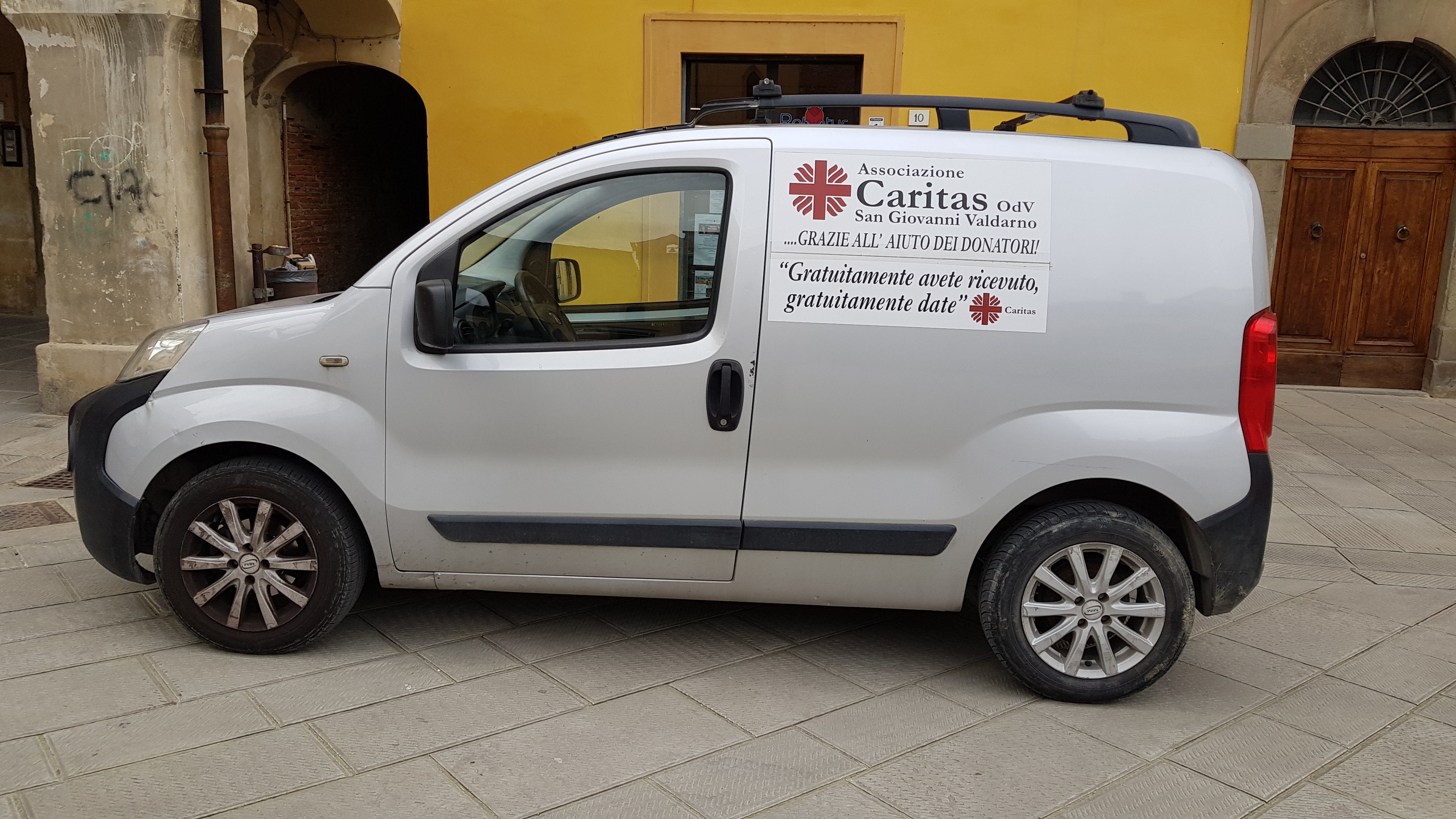
Van of the Italian parish Caritas San Giovanni Valdarno.

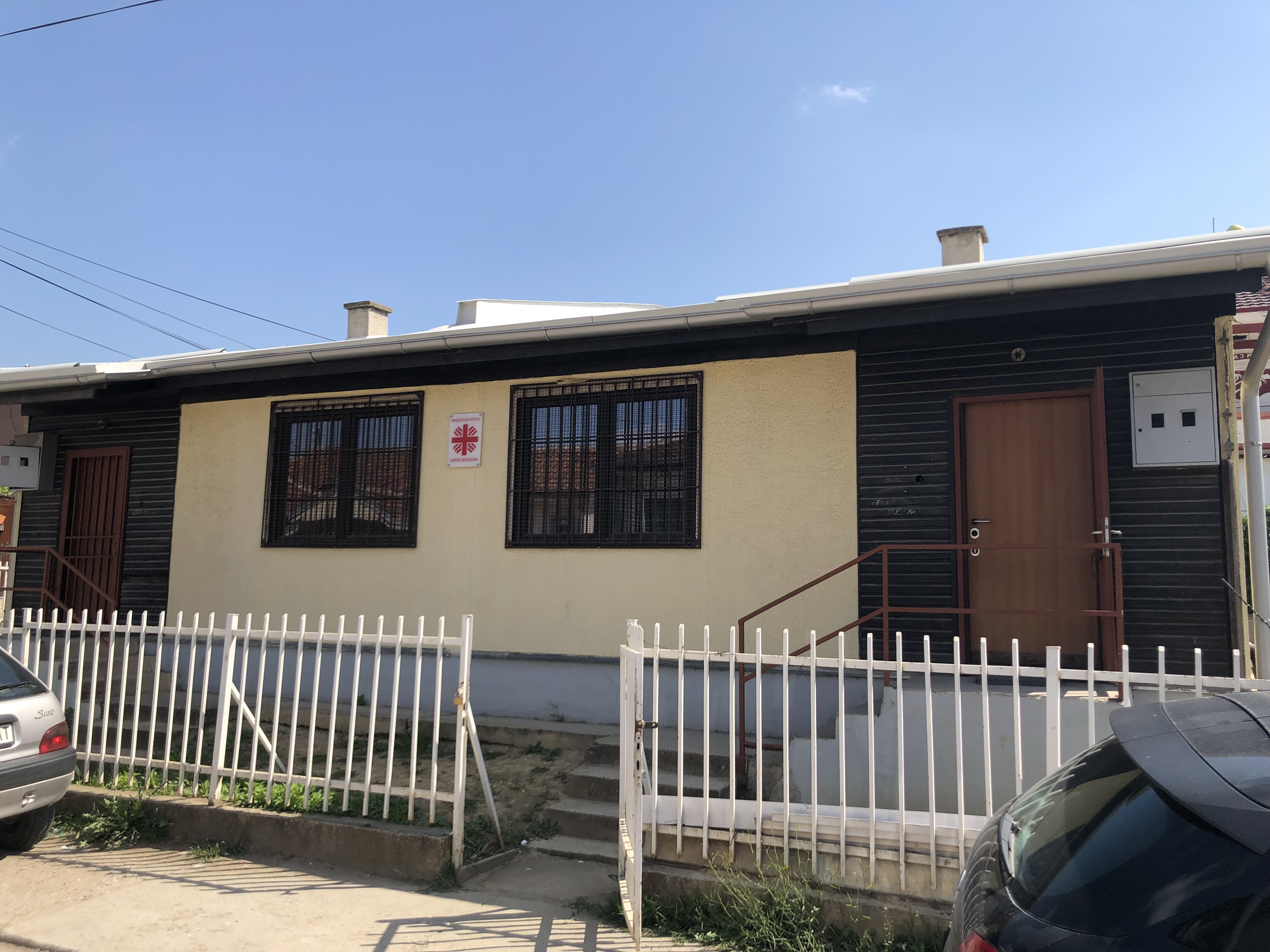
Centre in Šuto Orizari in which Macedonian Caritas offers school support to Romani children.

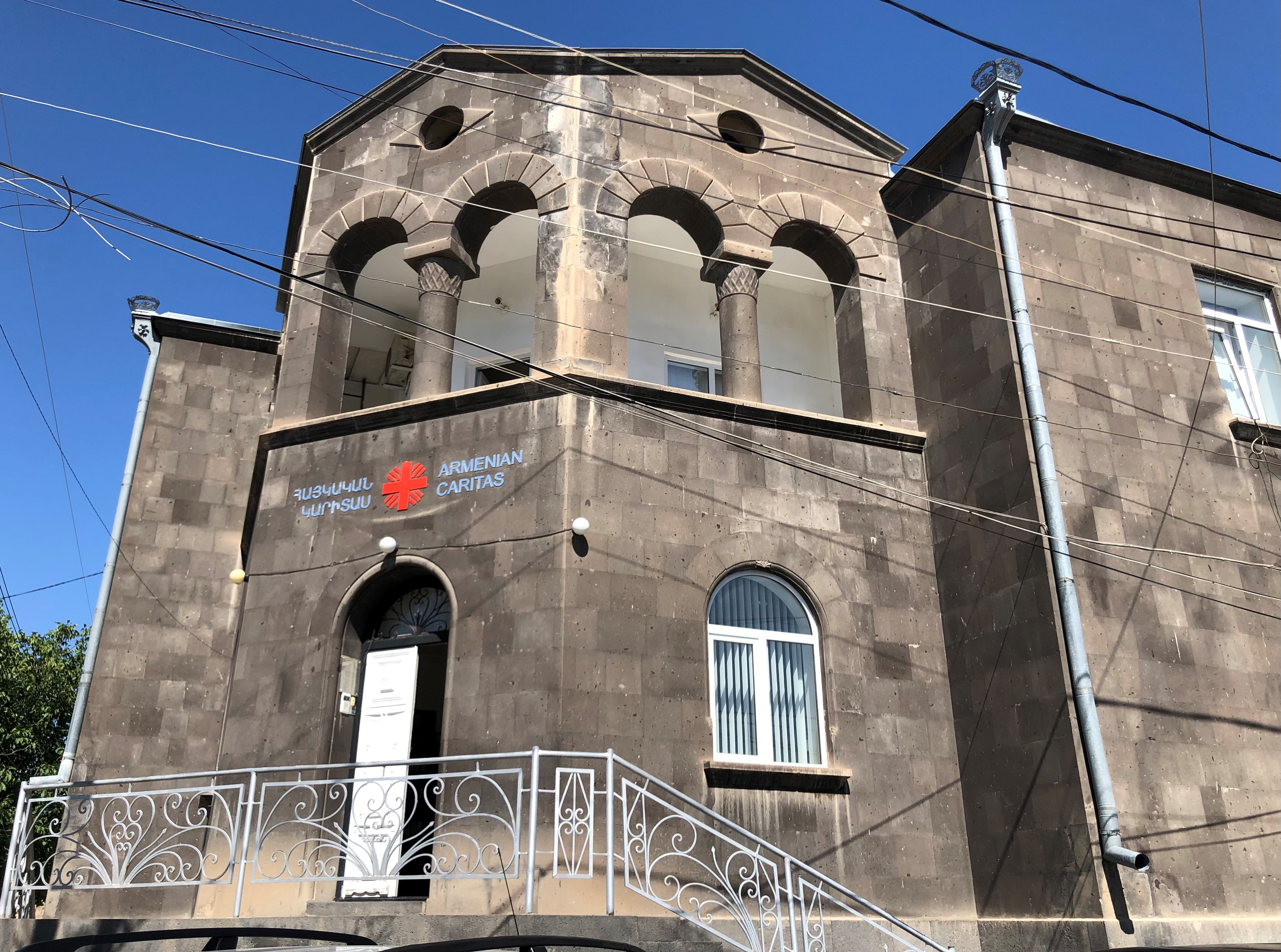
Headquarters of Armenian Caritas in Gyumri.

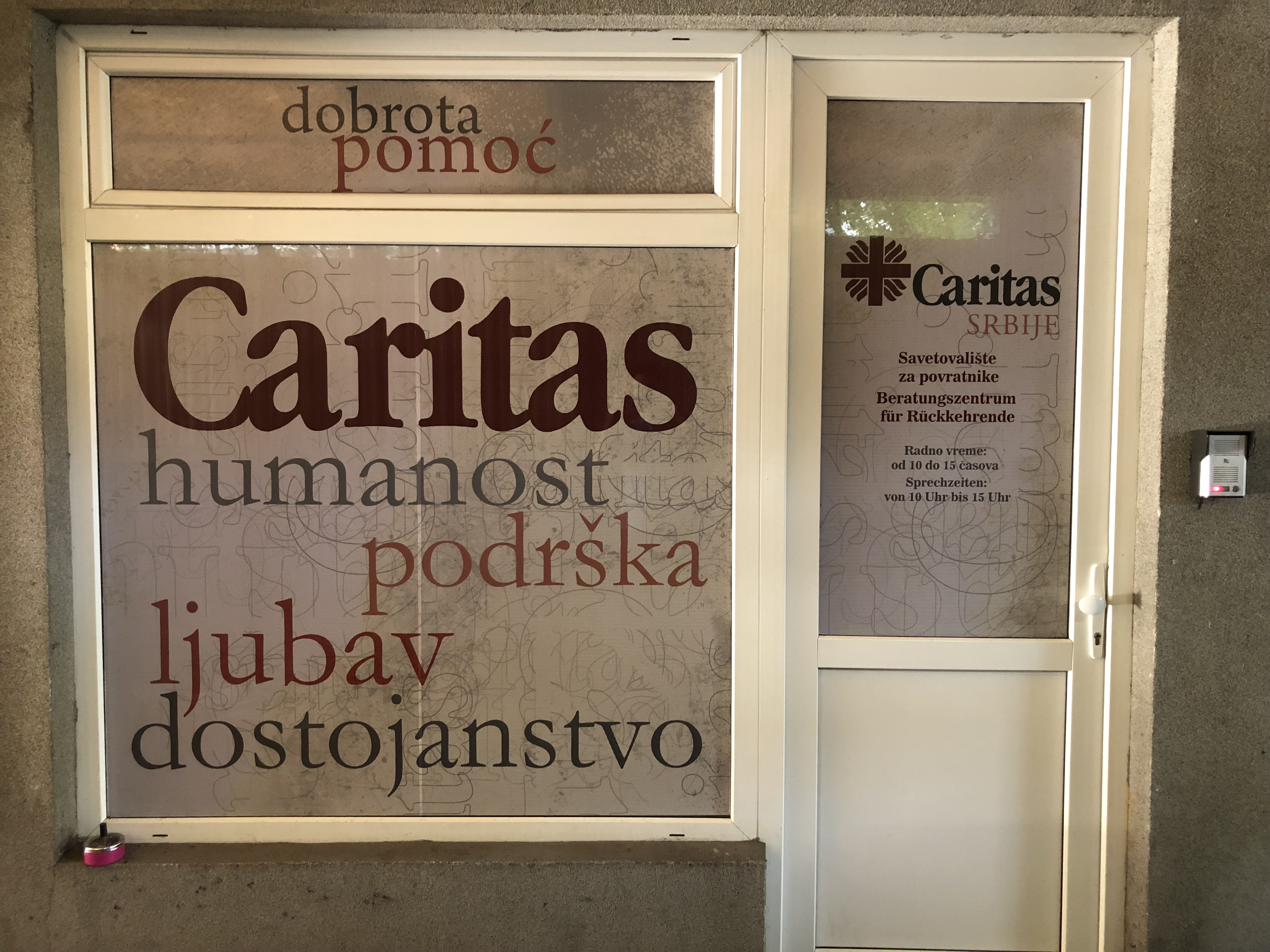
Counselling centre for returnees of Caritas Serbia in Belgrade

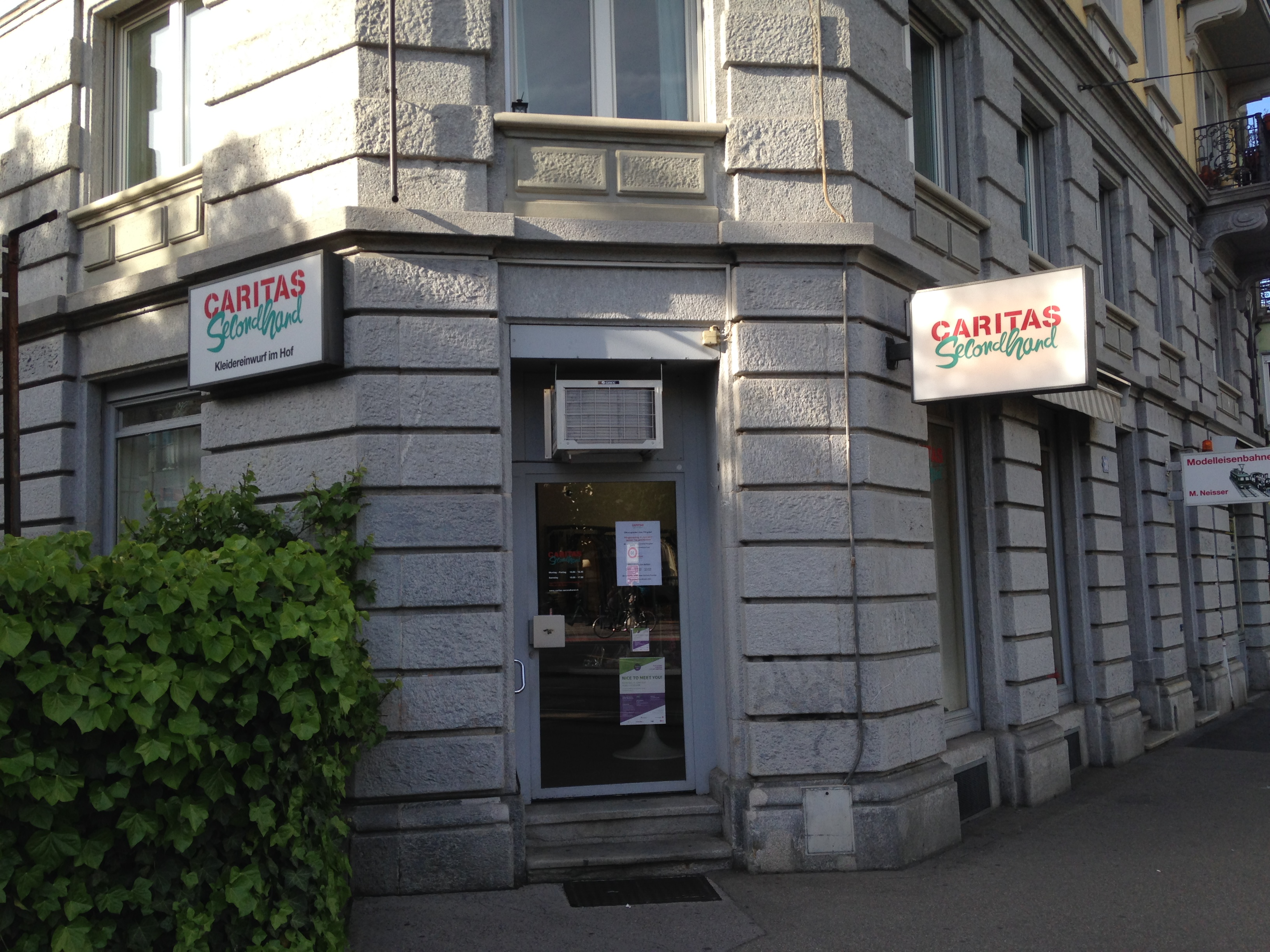
Second-hand store by Caritas Zurich.

Video presenting a social support project of Caritas Coimbra, one of the diocesan structures of Caritas Portugal.

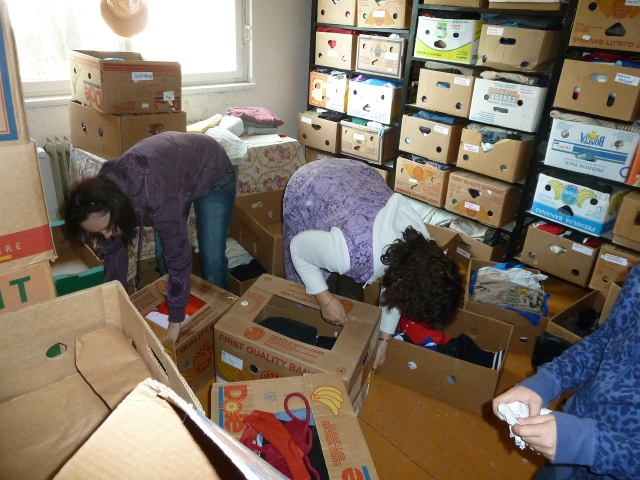
Volunteers of a Czech diocesan Caritas cleaning the second-hand wardrobe.

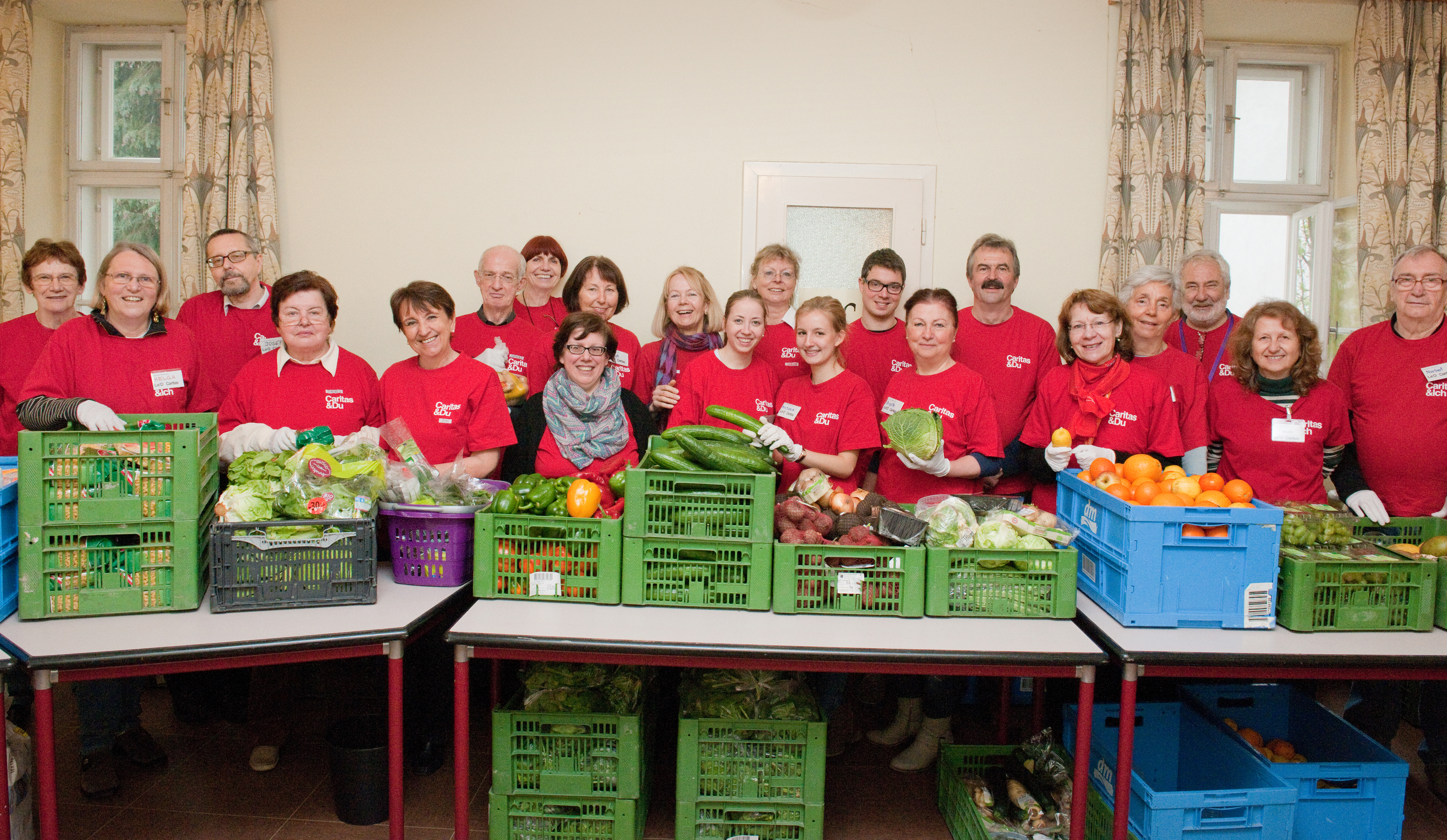
Volunteers of Caritas Vienna with fresh food produce.

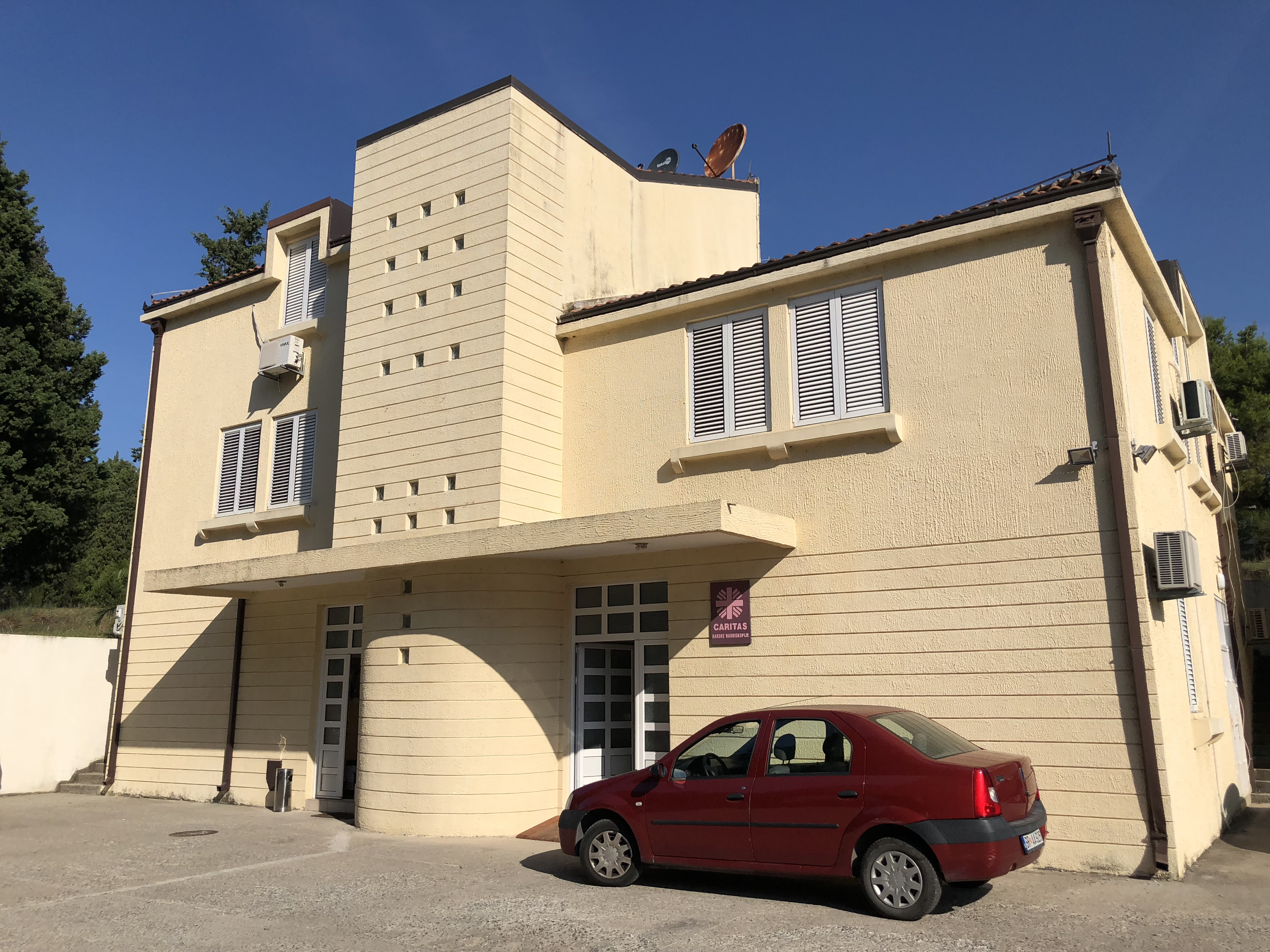
Guesthouse of Caritas Bar in Montenegro.

== Literature ==
- Moved With Compassion - The History of Caritas Europa - Festschrift on the Occasion of the 25th Anniversary of Caritas Europa's Statutes 1993-2018. Jorge Nuño Mayer. 2018. ISBN 978-972-9008-55-9.
