= Scottish Catholic International Aid Fund =

- Abbreviation: SCIAF
- Established: 1965; 61 years ago
- Type: Nonprofit
- Registration no.: SC012302
- Legal status: Company limited by guarantee
- Purpose: development aid, humanitarian aid
- Location: Glasgow, Scotland, United Kingdom
- Coordinates: 55.85571°N 4.25342°W
- Region served: Africa, Asia, Latin America, Scotland
- President: Bishop Brian McGee
- Chief Executive: Lorraine Currie
- Affiliations: Caritas Internationalis, Caritas Europa, CIDSE
- Revenue: £7,400,000 (2022)
- Expenses: £8,300,000 (2022)
- Website: www.sciaf.org.uk

The Scottish Catholic International Aid Fund, better known by its acronym SCIAF, is the official aid and development agency of the Catholic Church in Scotland. Established in 1965, SCIAF now works in eight countries across Asia, Africa and Latin America and providing assistance to vulnerable people. SCIAF works with partner organisations and has responded to humanitarian disasters with emergency provisions and support. In Scotland, SCIAF raises awareness of the underlying causes of global poverty and injustice, work that includes visiting schools.

As a Catholic agency, SCIAF is a member of the global Caritas Internationalis confederation and its subregion Caritas Europa as well as of CIDSE and the Scottish NGO network Scotland's International Development Alliance.

== History ==
SCIAF was set up in 1965 by Monsignor John Rooney and teacher John McKee with funds of £8,000. Efforts that had begun at a parish level were quickly endorsed by the Bishops' Conference of Scotland. In 1980, the organisation raised a record £212,000 for the third world.

When the 2004 Indian Ocean earthquake and tsunami occurred, SCIAF were quick in announcing a £25,000 donation to partner agencies. In 2007, the Scottish Government announced £250,000 would be given to SCIAF to help assist people affected by the war in Darfur.

A response to a drought in the Horn and east of Africa, an emergency appeal raised £1.1 million. In 2013, SCIAF launched an emergency appeal to help people in the Philippines who were affected by Typhoon Haiyan.

In 2015, as SCIAF marked their fiftieth anniversary, their international work included supporting almost 100 projects that provided emergency aid and assistance across at least fifteen countries in Africa, Asia and Latin America.

In 2017, SCIAF worked with Caritas Bangladesh to deliver aid to Rohingya refugees in Bangladesh who had fled Myanmar. The following year, in conjunction with Caritas Indonesia it responded with aid after the Sulawesi earthquake and tsunami. SCIAF has helped vulnerable young people in Uganda.

As of 2022, outwith Scotland SCIAF are active in eight countries: Democratic Republic of Congo, Ethiopia, Malawi, Rwanda, South Sudan, Zambia, Cambodia and Colombia.

Following the start of the Russian invasion of Ukraine, SCIAF provided support to Ukraine through the Caritas International network. In 2022, SCIAF provided €0.6 million for Caritas Ukraine, a Ukrainian Catholic not-for-profit and humanitarian relief organisation.

== Fundraising activities ==
SCIAF runs an annual Wee Box Big Change appeal, which encourages people to give up something for Lent and to use the money saved as a donation. In 2015 the appeal raised £3.4 million, which was three times the highest amount previously raised. In 2019 the appeal raised more than £0.9 million. In 2021 the Wee Box appeal raised more than £2.8 million, which included £1.3 million of match funding from the UK government.

SCIAF is one of nine partner organisations of Will Aid, the British will-writing scheme in which participating solicitors waive their usual fee to write a basic will and in exchange invite the client to donate to charity.

== See also ==
- Caritas Internationalis
- Caritas Europa
