= Caritas Latvia =

Latvian Catholic social welfare organisation

- Caritas Latvija
- Established: 10 November 2004; 21 years ago
- Founder: Episcopal Conference of Latvia
- Type: Nonprofit
- VAT ID no.: LV40008086191
- Registration no.: 40008086191
- Legal status: foundation
- Purpose: social services, humanitarian relief
- Location: Riga, Latvia
- Coordinates: 56.9507°N 24.1034°E
- Origins: Catholic Social Teaching
- Region served: Latvia
- Services: social services
- Official language: Latvian
- Director: Inese Švekle
- Affiliations: Caritas Internationalis, Caritas Europa
- Revenue: €927,450 412436 2021 (2022)
- Expenses: €849,346 352029 2021 (2022)
- Website: www.caritas.lv

Caritas Latvia (Latvian: Caritas Latvija) is a Catholic not-for-profit social welfare organisation in Latvia. It is a service of the Episcopal Conference of Latvia.

Caritas Latvia is a member of both Caritas Europa and Caritas Internationalis.

== History and work ==
A first charity organisation with the name Caritas Lavija was founded in 1995. The resources and facilities of this organisation were then taken over by the current organisation, established by the Latvian Bishops' Conference in 2004 and legally registered that same year.

The mission of the organisation is to spread "Christian love", implement charity work and provide support to the vulnerable persons in society, as well as to promote volunteering and regional and rural development.

In 2022, Caritas Latvia consisted of the national office and 19 local Caritas groups all over the country with in total around 160 volunteers. They provided assistance to approximately 500 people in need, including families, individual elderly people, children, people with disabilities, addicts, prisoners, and homeless people. The assistance provided was manifold and included the distribution of food packages and non-food products such as clothes and hygiene articles, the paiment of utility bills, but also accompaniment to medical consultations, home visits to lonely elderly people, visits to social care centres, children and youth centres and hospitals. Caritas social workers are also providing support to refugees and asylum seekers.

Caritas Latvia is a partner of the welfare department of the Riga City Council.

In 2022, Caritas Latvia also raised funds to support the work of its sister agencies Caritas Ukraine and Caritas-Spes Ukraine.

== Images ==
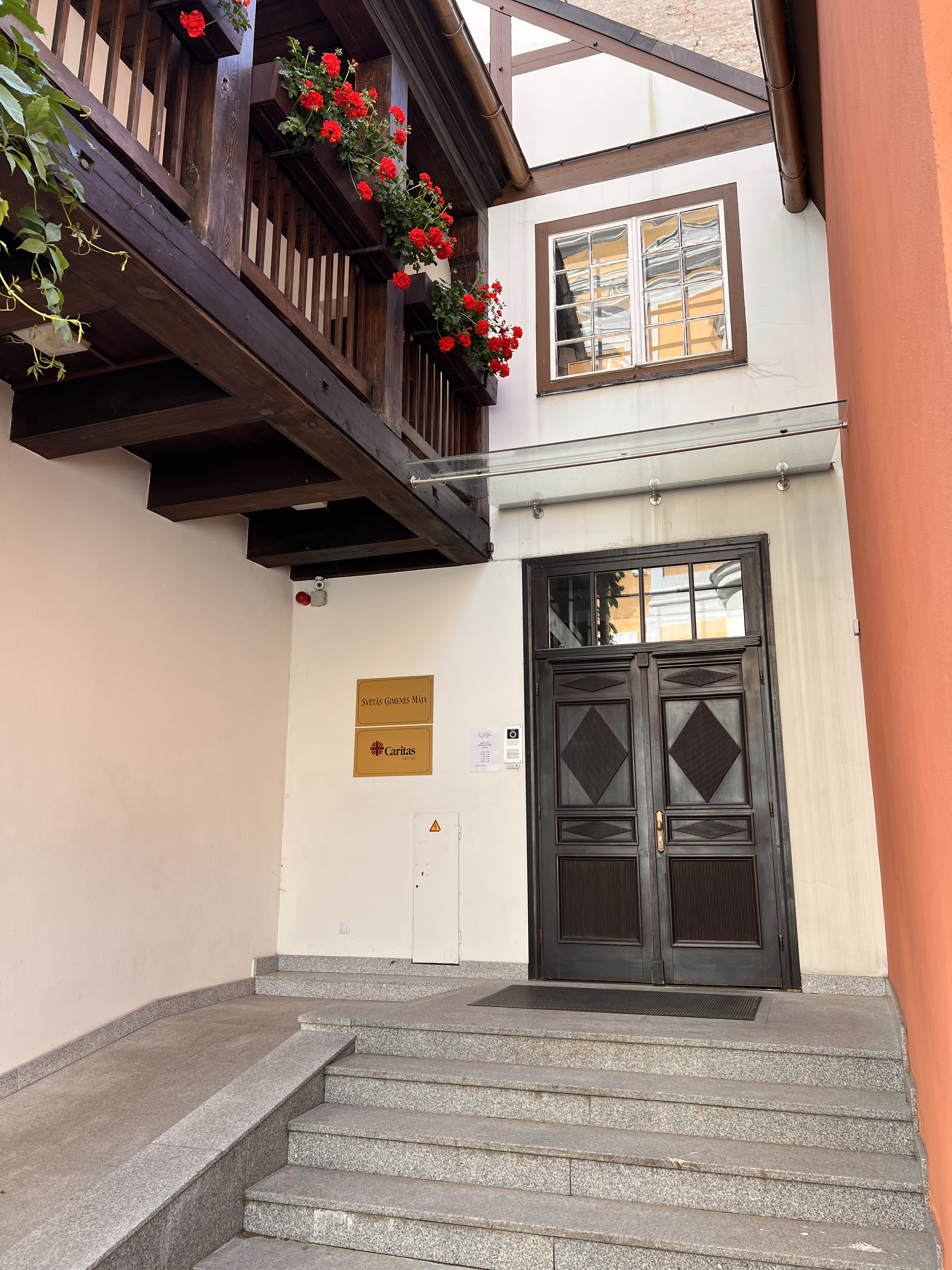
Entrance to the office of the Caritas Latvia in Riga old town.
