= Caritas Norway =

Norwegian Catholic relief and development organisation

- Caritas Norge
- Established: 1952; 74 years ago
- Type: nonprofit
- Legal status: foundation
- Purpose: development aid, humanitarian aid, social services
- Location: Oslo, Norway
- Coordinates: 59.9168°N 10.7492°E
- Region served: Norway and worldwide
- Secretary General: Ingrid Rosendorf Joys
- Chairman of the Board: Peter Kuran
- Affiliations: Caritas Europa, Caritas Internationalis
- Revenue: kr 317,201,510 (2023)
- Expenses: kr 301,011,892 (2023)
- Staff: 230 (2023)
- Volunteers: 80 (2023)
- Website: www.caritas.no
- Formerly called: Norwegian Catholic Help for Refugees (Norsk katolsk flyktninghjelp)

Caritas Norway (Norwegian: Caritas Norge) is a Catholic aid organisation from Norway. It is part of the European network of Caritas organisations Caritas Europa, as well of the global Caritas Internationalis confederation.

== History ==
Caritas Norway was founded in 1952 as Norwegian Catholic Help for Refugees (Norsk katolsk flyktninghjelp) by the Catholic Church in Norway. In 1964, it became an independent organisation and adopted its current name, initially under the Roman Catholic Diocese of Oslo, and later under the Norwegian Catholic Bishops' Council (Norsk Katolsk Bisperåd). Since 1991, the highest authority of Caritas Norway has been the council meeting, which includes representatives from all the Catholic congregations in the country. Today Caritas Norway is run as an independent humanitarian foundation.

== Work ==
As a humanitarian relief and development agency, Caritas Norway implements projects according to the localisation principle. This means that Caritas Norway does not implement projects directly, but supports partner organisations across the world in their work. The partner organisations work in Africa, Asia, Europe, Latin America, and the Middle East. The supported projects reached more than 955,000 people in 2023: 31% through humanitarian relief activities, 57% through long-term development projects, and 12% through collaboration across projects.

That same year, the budget for international projects reached almost 284 million NOK. Funding sources included private donors, the Ministry of Foreign Affairs and the Norwegian Agency for Development Cooperation.

In Norway, Caritas offers various services, including resource centres for immigrants located in Oslo, Bergen, Stavanger, Drammen, and Trondheim. At these centres, both employees and volunteers assist immigrants by providing information and guidance on their rights and opportunities within the Norwegian labour market, temporary and permanent housing, employment advice, job vacancies, and application processes, as well as legal and health counselling. Additionally, they offer Norwegian language courses, career counselling, and other activities for asylum seekers in reception centres. In 2017, Caritas Norway launched an au pair centre to support au pairs and host families.

In 2018, 12,000 migrant workers and refugees attended Norwegian language courses under the auspices of Caritas and Caritas helped 500 persons find employment.
