= Caritas Slovenia =

Catholic charity organization

- Slovenska karitas
- Established: 1 May 1990
- Type: Nonprofit
- Purpose: social work, humanitarian aid
- Headquarters: Kristanova ulica 1
- Location: Ljubljana, Slovenia
- Coordinates: 46.05052°N 14.51091°E
- Origins: Catholic Social Teaching
- Region served: Slovenia and worldwide
- Secretary General: Peter Tomažič
- President: Alojzij Cvikl
- Affiliations: Caritas Europa, Caritas Internationalis
- Expenses: 28.6 million € (2023)
- Volunteers: 10,161 (2023)
- Website: www.karitas.si

Caritas Slovenia (Slovene: Slovenska karitas) is a Slovenian Catholic charity organisation. It operates nationally by providing social welfare services, and internationally by supporting the relief and development efforts of partner organisations.

Caritas Slovenia is a member of both Caritas Internationalis and Caritas Europa.

== History ==
Catholic charitable actions existed in the territory that is now the Republic of Slovenia already in the first half of the 20th century, but all organised Church charitable activities were banned after the Second World War, although they continued to be carried out on a small scale in the parishes.

The Slovenian Bishops' Conference founded the national Caritas Slovenia on 1 May 1990, in the context of the democratisation of Slovenia. The driving force behind this initiative was Archbishop Alojzij Šuštar. Shortly after the creation of the national organisation, three more diocesan Caritas organisations were established: Caritas Ljubljana on 29 June 1990, Caritas Koper on 6 September 1990, and Caritas Maribor on 12 October 1990, along with numerous parish Caritas organisations.

Shortly after Slovenia declared independence, followed by the Ten-Day War, conflicts continued during the Breakup of Yugoslavia in other republics, leading to the arrival of many refugees. Caritas played a crucial role in assisting these refugees in Slovenia.

In 1995, Slovenian Caritas became a full member of Caritas Internationalis and Caritas Europa.

Three institutes were also established for the implementation of specific social programmes: the Zavod Pelikan – Karitas drug addiction treatment centre (founded on 20 February 1997), the Čebela Karitas daycare centre (founded on 21 May 1997), and the Zavod Karitas Samarijan social centre (founded on 24 March 2000). Finally, three more diocesan organisations were created: Caritas Novo mesto was founded on 15 September 2006, Caritas Murska Sobota on 1 January 2007, and Caritas Celje on 2 February 2007.

== Work and impact ==
=== Domestic work ===
Caritas Slovenia provides a variety of social welfare programmes across the country, including areas such as drug addiction support, maternity homes, homeless shelters, outpatient clinics for the uninsured, and assistance for victims of human trafficking. Additionally, the organisation acts as an important humanitarian actor, extending support to various segments of society, such as aiding victims of the 2023 floods with essential needs.

In 2023, the organisation supported a total of 153,491 individuals, including almost 30,000 children and 40,000 elderly persons. Notably, more than 111,000 people received food assistance during this period. This work is carried out by employed staff, but largely also by its network of more than 11,000 volunteers.

=== International work ===
In addition to its domestic work, the national Caritas Slovenia office also supports development and humanitarian projects abroad, in particular in Africa, in Asia, and in eastern and south-eastern Europe. The priority of these programmes lies on water and food supply, education, and healthcare.

== Structure ==
The structure of Caritas follows the structure of the Catholic Church in Slovenia and consists of one national office as well ass six diocesan Caritas organisations:

- Diocesan Caritas Ljubljana (Škofijska karitas Ljubljana)
- Archdiocesan Caritas Maribor (Škofijska karitas Maribor)
- Diocesan Caritas Koper (Škofijska karitas Koper)
- Diocesan Caritas Novo Mesto (Škofijska karitas Novo mesto)
- Diocesan Caritas of Celje (Škofijska karitas Celje)
- Diocesan Caritas Murska Sobota (Škofijska karitas Murska Sobota)

In addition, there exist around 450 local parish Caritas organisations, and three specialised institutes: the Institute Pelikan, the Samaritan Caritas Institute, and the Karion Institute.
