= Caritas Portugal =

Portuguese Catholic charitable organization

- Cáritas Portuguesa
- Established: 1945; 81 years ago
- Founder: Fernanda Mendes de Almeida Ivens Ferraz Jardim, 1º President (Countess of Valenças)
- Type: Nonprofit
- Registration no.: 500291756
- Legal status: Religious institution
- Purpose: social work, social policy, humanitarian aid, development aid
- Headquarters: Praça Pasteur, nº
- Location: Lisbon, Portugal
- Coordinates: 38.74106°N 9.13596°W
- President: Rita Valadas
- Affiliations: Caritas Internationalis, Caritas Europa
- Website: www.caritas.pt

Caritas Portugal (Portuguese: Cáritas Portuguesa) is the official Catholic Church organization in Portugal for charity and social relief, instituted by the Portuguese Episcopal Conference. It is a member of Caritas Internationalis and Caritas Europa.

Caritas Portuguesa was founded in 1945, with its first statutes approved in 1956.

From the 1950s to mid-1970s, its activities focused primarily on the distribution of food to the Portuguese population, donated by the United States, and the hosting of children from Central European countries in the aftermath of World War II and the beginning of Cold War tensions.

With the outbreak of the Colonial War, this institution assumed responsibility, in 1961, for providing assistance to the victims of the conflict in Angola and to Portuguese displaced persons in the former Belgian Congo, with the implicit support of the President of the Council, António de Oliveira Salazar, acting through the Ministry of Ultramar.

== Organization ==
Caritas Portugal is a Portuguese confederation of Catholic relief, development and social service organizations operating in Portugal. Caritas Portugal consists of 20 regional member organizations known as dioceses.

The organization's national headquarters are located in Lisbon; from there it provides general assistance to the regional dioceses.

== See also ==
- Caritas Internationalis
- Caritas Europa
