= Guido Van Oevelen =

Guido Van Oevelen (born 6 January 1950) was appointed as President of Caritas Catholica Flanders on 24 January 2008, he succeeded Willy Geysen. Van Oevelen came to office on 8 May 2008 and will serve for a period of four years.

Born in Essen, he graduated as a clinical psychologist at the Katholieke Universiteit Leuven and as a licentiate in medical social sciences and health management.

In 1998 he was involved in the foundation of the Belgian branch of the non-profit organization Emmaus active in healthcare and welfare. Since 2006, he is President of the board of directors of the Verbond van Verzorgingsinstellingen (VVI). He also worked in leading positions at CERA and Almanij.

== Sources ==
- Guido Van Oevelen wordt de nieuwe voorzitter van Caritas Vlaanderen
- Nieuwe voorzitter voor Caritas Vlaanderen
- Guido Van Oevelen nieuwe voorzitter Caritas Vlaanderen
