= Caritas Bosnia and Herzegovina =

- Caritas Bosne i Hercegovine
- Abbreviation: Caritas BiH
- Established: 28 January 1995; 31 years ago
- Founder: Episcopal Conference of Bosnia and Herzegovina
- Type: Nonprofit
- Purpose: development aid, humanitarian relief, social services
- Location: Sarajevo, Bosnia and Herzegovina
- Coordinates: 41.3349°N 19.8064°E
- Origins: Catholic social teaching
- Region served: Bosnia and Herzegovina
- Official language: Croatian, English
- President: Archbishop Tomo Vukšić
- Affiliations: Caritas Europa, Caritas Internationalis
- Website: www.caritas.ba
- Formerly called: Caritas of the Bishops' Conference of Bosnia and Herzegovina (Caritas Biskupske konferencije Bosne i Hercegovine)

Caritas Bosnia and Herzegovina (Serbo-Croatian: Caritas Bosne i Hercegovine) is a Catholic not-for-profit social welfare and humanitarian relief organisation in Bosnia and Herzegovina. It is a service of the Episcopal Conference of Bosnia and Herzegovina and a full member of both Caritas Europa and Caritas Internationalis.

== Structure ==
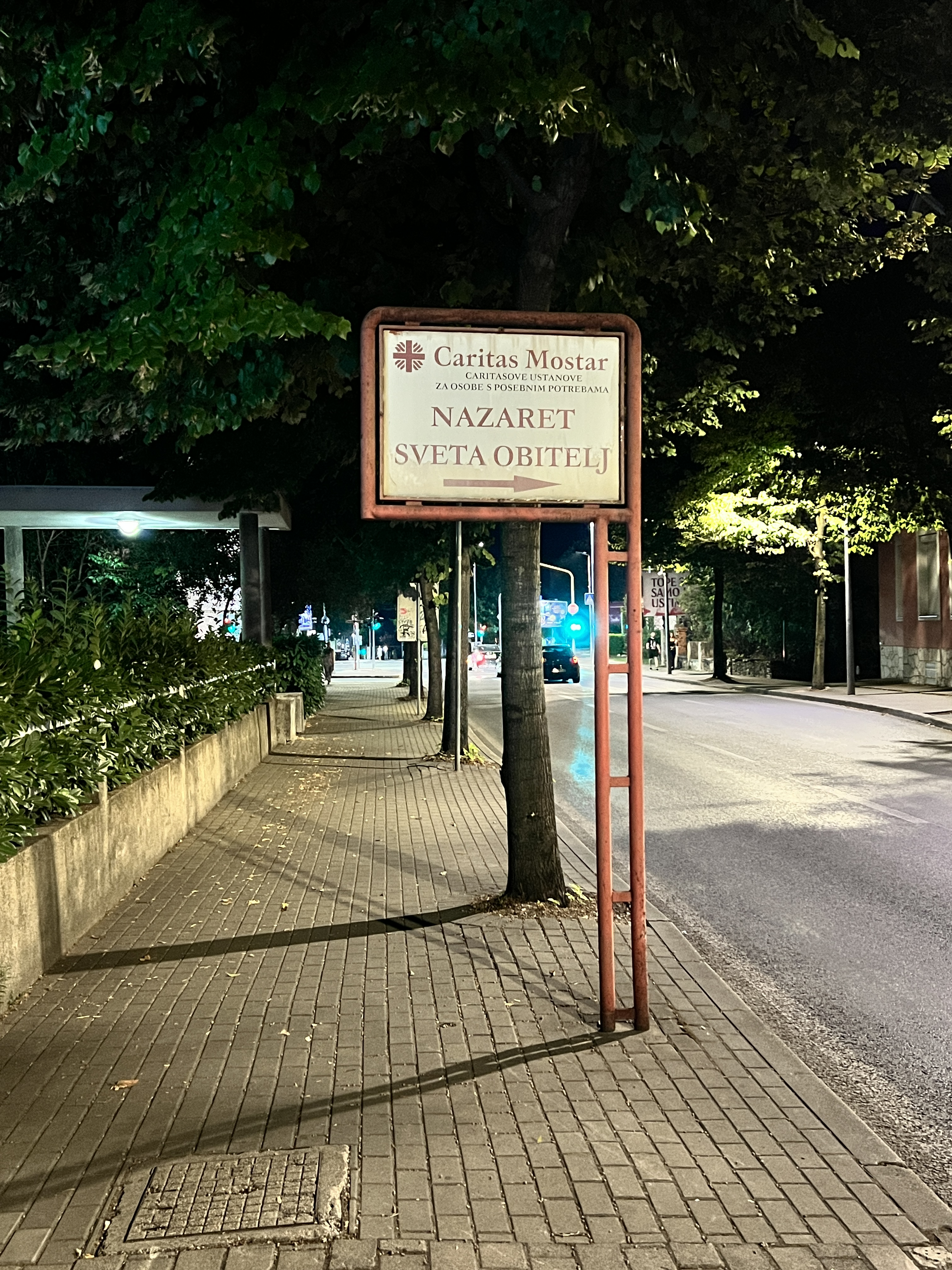
Street sign in Mostar indicating the way to the Caritas Mostar rehabilitation centre Sveta Obitelj ("Holy Family").

The structure of Caritas is the same as the structure of the Catholic Church in Bosnia and Herzegovina. Caritas Bosnia and Herzegovina consists of the national office as well as of three regional, autonomous organisations, the so-called diocesan Caritas. The three diocesan Caritas are:

- Caritas Banja Luka (Caritas biskupija Banja Luka)
- Caritas Mostar-Duvno (Caritas biskupija Mostar-Duvno i Trebinje-Mrkan)
- Caritas Vrhbosna (Caritas Vrhbosanske nadbiskupije)

All four entities support people affected by poverty in the country and contribute therewith to social integration.

== History ==
Caritas Vrhbosna (Sarajevo) was founded in 1931, Caritas Mostar in 1982, and Caritas Banja Luka in 1984. During the Bosnian War (1992–1995), these three organisations played an important role in providing humanitarian aid to the people of Bosnia and Herzegovina and they continued after the war to be actively involved in the reconstruction efforts.

The first session of the newly formed Bishops' Conference of Bosnia and Herzegovina took place in Mostar from 27 to 29 January 1995. On 28 January, the Bishops founded the national Caritas organisation under the name "Caritas of the Bishops' Conference of Bosnia and Herzegovina" (Caritas Biskupske konferencije Bosne i Hercegovine) and approved the statutes.

In 1997, Caritas, as a sign of recognition for the help and care provided to the people of Bosnia and Herzegovina during the war, was awarded the Pope John XXIII International Peace Prize, alongside the Muslim organisation Merhamet, the Serbian Orthodox organisation Dobrotvor and the Jewish organisation La Benevolencija.

Caritas BiH has been a member of Caritas Internationalis since 30 June 1999, and based on that membership, it also became a member of Caritas Europa. The second Statute was approved and entered into force on 14 February 2006. At their 65th regular session held in Sarajevo on 4 and 5 November 2015, the bishops approved the third version of the statutes and changed the name of the organisation from Caritas of the Bishops' Conference of Bosnia and Herzegovina to Caritas of Bosnia and Herzegovina.

== Work ==
After the Bosnian war, Caritas implemented reconstruction projects and various activities aimed at reducing poverty and integrating vulnerable individuals into society. The organisation works among other with children, persons with disabilities, and the elderly.

Caritas also continues its relief work, supporting for example the population affected by the large-scale 2014 floods and the migrants, refugees and asylum seeker that arrived in the country since the start of the 2015 European migrant crisis. Between 2018 and 2021 alone, Caritas helped over 60,000 migrants in the country, providing among other food and hygiene articles, and operating a laundry service that allows them to wash their clothes.

Caritas Switzerland and the American Caritas organisation Catholic Relief Services also operate country offices in Bosnia and Herzegovina and implement their own programmes.
