= Caritas Finland =

Finnish Catholic aid organisation

- Suomen Caritas ry
- Suomen Caritas
- Finnish-language logo
- Formation: 22 October 1960; 66 years ago
- Type: Nonprofit
- Purpose: social justice
- Location: Helsinki, Finland
- Services: development aid, social services
- Secretary General: Larissa Franz-Koivisto
- President: Raimo Goyarrola
- Affiliations: Caritas Europa, Caritas Internationalis, Finnish Ecumenical Council
- Website: www.caritas.fi

Caritas Finland in English and Swedish or Suomen Caritas in Finnish is a Catholic aid organisation from Finland. It is part of the European network of Caritas organisations Caritas Europa, as well of the global Caritas Internationalis confederation.

== History ==
In October 1960, Caritas Finland emerged from the Katrina Association, which had been founded in 1927. Its values and work are rooted in Catholic social teaching.

In 2011, Bishop Emeritus Teemu Sippo began to integrate Caritas Finland into the Catholic diocese. This initiative followed Pope Benedict's decision to appoint Caritas as the official aid and development cooperation organisation of the Catholic Church. Caritas Finland was reformed and established in its current form in 2015 with new statutes to meet the management standards of Caritas Internationalis. Larissa Franz-Koivisto was appointed as the first Secretary General.

Caritas Finland is a partnership organisation of the Finnish Ecumenical Council, a member of the Finnish development NGO network FINGO, and of the Blue Ribbon Foundation (Sininauhaliitto), a network of experts in homelessness and substance abuse services. The Blue Ribbon Foundation is also a member of the European Anti Poverty Network.

== Work ==
In Finland, Caritas primarily works with immigrants in cooperation with Catholic parishes. In recent years, Caritas Finland has expanded its operations. It is part of Helsinki's Stadin Safka network, which utilizes food that would otherwise go to waste. In 2022, through events organised every other week at the Caritas office, more than 500 food aid bags were distributed to persons in need. Caritas also offers guidance and counselling services on issues such as residence permits, employment, and housing. Additionally, it organises "friendship cafés" and excursions aimed at creating social links between people.

At the international level, Caritas Finland supports development cooperation projects in Latin America, Asia and Africa with local partners and other European Caritas organisations.

Caritas Finland receives financial support from individuals through membership fees and donations, communities, and public sector actors in Finland. It does not receive any financial support from the Catholic Church of Finland. The organisation also works with volunteers. The office of Caritas Finland is located in the Meilahti neighbourhood of Helsinki, where the organisation also operates a small shop.
