= Caritas Montenegro =

Catholic social welfare and relief organisation

- Caritas Crne Gore
- Predecessor: part of Caritas Yugoslavia, then Caritas Serbia and Montenegro
- Established: 2011; 15 years ago
- Type: Nonprofit
- Registration no.: 6679
- Purpose: social welfare, social justice
- Location: Bar, Montenegro
- Coordinates: 42.0927°N 19.1152°E
- Services: social services, humanitarian aid
- President: Bishop Rrok Gjonlleshaj
- Director: Marko Đelović
- Affiliations: Caritas Europa, Caritas Internationalis
- Website: caritascg.me

Caritas Montenegro (Montenegrin: Caritas Crne Gore) is a not-for-profit social welfare organisation in Montenegro. It is a service of the Catholic Church in Montenegro and is a member of both the global Caritas Internationalis and the regional Caritas Europa networks.

== History ==
The origins of Caritas activities in Montenegro trace back to the 1979 earthquake, which devastated large parts of the Socialist Republic of Montenegro. However, significant organisational development only occurred in the 1990s, following the breakup of Yugoslavia and the subsequent Yugoslav Wars. During this period, Caritas in Montenegro provided humanitarian aid to internally displace people and to refugees from Bosnia and Herzegovina, Croatia, and later Kosovo, continuing this support until around 2003.

In 2011, Caritas Montenegro became an independent organisation, having previously functioned under Caritas Yugoslavia and later Caritas Serbia and Montenegro. Over time, its focus shifted from humanitarian relief to providing social assistance and services to impoverished and marginalised groups in Montenegro. Its initiatives now include developing civil society and the social economy, youth engagement, mental health advocacy, supporting Roma communities, and establishing social services for the elderly and people with disabilities.

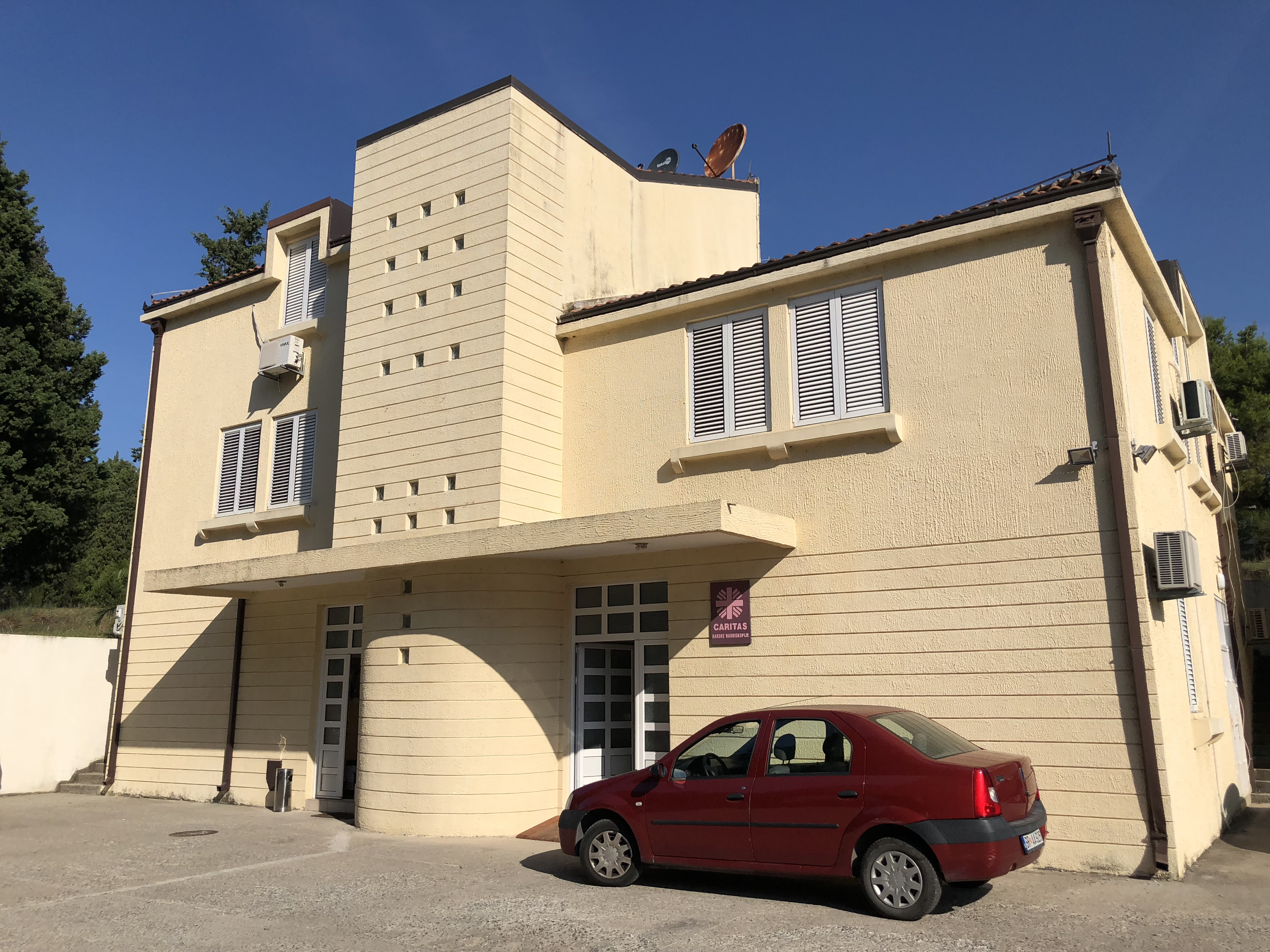
Headquarters of Caritas Montenegro in the coastal town of Bar.

Caritas Montenegro consists of a national office located in the coastal city of Bar and of the two autonomous, diocesan Caritas organisations: Caritas of the Archdiocese of Bar, registered in 2002, and Caritas of the Diocese of Kotor, registered in 2014.

== Work ==
Since becoming independent in 2011, Caritas Montenegro has concentrated on various fields, including enhancing technical skills for people with disabilities to facilitate their societal integration. This effort includes promoting social enterprises, leading to the establishment of several such initiatives. In 2016, Caritas Bar opened a laundry service and a toy and souvenir workshop in Bar, followed by copy shops in Bar (2016) and Berane (2018).

Addressing youth unemployment and emigration is another priority for Caritas Montenegro. The organisation aims to create job opportunities for young people and prepare them for the labour market. Cooperation with the national Employment Agency of Montenegro began as early as 2000.

In the social field, Caritas has also been active in home care for the elderly. Additionally, the diocesan Caritas of Kotor operates a soup kitchen in Tivat.

Humanitarian action remains a key pillar of Caritas Montenegro's work. The organisation provided emergency assistance to refugees transiting Montenegro during the 2015 European migrant crisis and offered support to Ukrainian refugees following the 2022 Russian invasion of Ukraine. Caritas also raises funds and collects humanitarian goods for its partner organisations in neighbouring countries responding to local disasters, such as the 2019 Albania earthquake or the 2024 Bosnia and Herzegovina floods.

Caritas Montenegro funds its work through donations and financial contributions from international partner organisations. It has also participated in several EU-funded regional and cross-border projects.
