= Caritas Catholica Belgica =

Belgian confederation of Catholic charity organisations

- Established: 6 August 1932; 93 years ago
- Type: Nonprofit association
- VAT ID no.: 0409.095.421
- Purpose: social welfare, social justice
- Location: Saint-Josse-ten-Noode, Brussels-Capital Region, Belgium
- Coordinates: 50.8476°N 4.3704°E
- Origins: Catholic Social Teaching
- Region served: Belgium
- Services: social services, humanitarian aid
- Official language: French, Dutch, German
- Affiliations: Caritas Internationalis, Caritas Europa
- Website: caritas.be

Caritas Catholica Belgica, also known as Caritas in Belgium (Dutch: Caritas in België, French: Caritas en Belgique) is a Belgian confederation of Catholic relief, development and social service organizations operating in Flanders and Wallonia. The organization used to group about 1,100 institutions active in healthcare in Belgium.

== History ==
Caritas Catholica Belgica was founded in 1932 at the initiative of the Belgian bishops as the Katholieke Dienst voor Hygiëne en Hulpbetoon. In 1935, the name became Caritas Catholica Belgica.

In 1982, the organization was split into Caritas Vlaanderen (Caritas Catholica Flanders, Flanders) and Caritas en Communauté Française et Germanophone (Caritas Catholica Wallonia, Wallonia) and Caritas International as a national organization.

== See also ==
- Caritas Internationalis
- Caritas Europa
- Guido Van Oevelen
- Willy Geysen
