= Caritas Andorra =

Andorran Catholic social welfare organisation

- Càritas Andorrana
- Established: 12 April 1979; 47 years ago
- Founder: Bishop Joan Martí i Alanis
- Type: Institution of the Catholic Church
- Purpose: social justice, humanitarian aid
- Headquarters: Santa Maria del Fener Church
- Location: Andorra la Vella, Andorra
- Coordinates: 42.5074°N 1.5326°E
- Origins: Catholic Social Teaching
- Region served: Andorra
- Services: social services: counselling, food, clothes, housing
- Official language: Catalan
- President: Anna Villas
- Affiliations: Caritas Europa, Caritas Internationalis
- Revenue: 530,117.90 Euro (2023)
- Expenses: 682,868.33 Euro (2023)
- Volunteers: 89 (2023)
- Website: caritas.ad

Caritas Andorra (Catalan: Càritas Andorrana) is a not-for-profit social welfare organisation in Andorra. It is a service of the Catholic Church in Andorra and a member of both Caritas Internationalis and Caritas Europa.

== History ==
In the 1960s and 1970s already, there were Caritas organisations active at parish level in Andorra. On 12 April 1979, this activity was formalised with the establishment, according to canon law, of Caritas Andorra, the national federation of all parish Caritas in the country.

In 1983, during the 12th General Assembly of Caritas Internationalis in Rome, Caritas Andorra was accepted as a full member of the global confederation.

The latest statutes of the organisation were approved in 1994.

== Structure ==
Càritas Andorrana is an institution of the Roman Catholic Diocese of Urgell of which the entire country of Andorra forms a part.

Each of the seven parishes of Andorra have their own parish Caritas ("Càritas parroquial") which together make up the federation that is Caritas Andorra: Caritas Andorra la Vella, Caritas Canillo, Caritas Encamp, Caritas Escaldes–Engordany, Caritas La Massana, Caritas Ordino, and Caritas Sant Julià de Lòria.

== Work ==
In line with its mission to support the most vulnerable members of society, Caritas Andorra provides assistance in various ways. The Acollida ("reception") programme offers personalised, holistic support to individuals and families in difficulty, including counselling, legal and psychological assistance, as well as help with housing, employment, and daily needs. The organisation also manages a food bank and a second-hand clothing store.

Thanks to property donations from individuals, Caritas Andorra is able to provide rental homes at social and affordable prices. The organisation collaborates with the government by participating in the National Housing Commission and has developed a specific programme aimed at promoting fair and sustainable housing policies, ensuring access to decent housing for everyone in the country.

In 2023, Caritas Andorra supported 1,148 individuals in need.

Beyond its domestic efforts, Caritas Andorra aids victims of disasters and emergencies abroad. For instance, it raised funds for those affected by the 2023 Turkey earthquake and provided humanitarian relief items to those impacted by the 2024 Valenica floods.

Caritas Andorra funds its initiatives through private and corporate donations, including support from the association of Andorran Banks (Andorran Banking), Andorra Telecom, Creand and the Andorran government.
