= Will Aid =

Charity will-writing organisation

- Founded: 1988
- Founder: Graeme Pagan
- Type: Charity partnership established by Deed
- Location: The Print House, 18-22 Aswhin Street, London
- Region served: United Kingdom
- Method: For the month of November, participating solicitors waive their fee to write a basic will or a pair of mirror wills. In return, they invite clients to make a voluntary donation to Will Aid.
- Key people: Peter de Vena Franks (Campaign Director)
- Website: willaid.org.uk

Will Aid is a British charity will-writing scheme designed to reinforce the need for everyone to have a professionally drawn-up will and to raise funds for their partner charities. Will Aid was founded in 1988 following the example set by Band Aid and Live Aid and continues to run each November.

== Scheme operation ==
Will Aid recruits solicitors all over the UK who agree to waive their usual fee for writing basic wills during 'Make a Will Month' in November.

== Supported charities ==
Will Aid is a partnership of charities: Age UK, the British Red Cross, Christian Aid, NSPCC, Save the Children, SCIAF, and Trócaire.

== Fundraising ==
Will Aid has raised over £21m since its launch and many tens of million more has been pledged as legacies by people making their Will through the scheme. The 2020 campaign raised over £600k in donations.

== Will Aid and the legal profession ==
Will Aid is the largest scheme of its kind in the UK and is a major charitable contribution from the British legal profession. Hundreds solicitors firms take part each year. In the 2020 campaign, over 450 solicitors took part. Since the scheme was launched, participating solicitors have drawn up wills for over 310,000 people.

== Publicity ==
Will Aid has received press coverage in the UK in both national and regional press and consumer magazines.
