= Caritas Serbia =

Serbian humanitarian organisation

- Caritas Srbije
- Established: 1995; 31 years ago
- Type: Nonprofit
- Purpose: social services
- Location: Belgrade, Serbia
- Coordinates: 44.7813°N 20.4717°E
- Origins: Catholic Social Teaching
- Region served: Serbia
- Services: social services, humanitarian aid, disaster risk reduction
- President: Ladislav Nemet
- Director: Mihai Gherghel
- Affiliations: Caritas Europa, Caritas Internationalis
- Website: caritas.rs

Caritas Serbia (Serbian: Caritas Srbije) is a not-for-profit social welfare and humanitarian relief organisation in Serbia. It is a service of the Catholic Church in Serbia.

Caritas Serbia is a member of both Caritas Europa and Caritas Internationalis.

== History and work ==
The organization was founded in 1995, initially called Caritas Yugoslavia, then Caritas Serbia and Montenegro before taking its current name, reflecting the name changes of the country. In first years, it provided support to the large number of internally displaced persons and refugees caused by the Yugoslav Wars. It established itself as a humanitarian actor involved in distributions of food and fuel and offering shelter to thousands of people. During and after the 1999 NATO bombing of Yugoslavia, Caritas Serbia was involved in relief efforts by continuing distributions to individuals and collective centres such as health and educational facilities. According to its own statements, Caritas Serbia supported over two million persons between 1995 and 2000.

After the wars, the organization worked on home care for the sick and elderly, youth drug prevention, and peacebuilding programmes, among other.

During the devastating 2014 floods, Caritas Serbia launched a large-scale humanitarian response, providing food, hygiene items, and livestock feed to 5,200 affected families. The total budget for this effort exceeded 2 million euros. In the aftermath of the floods, the organisation also solidified its reputation as a key civil society expert in disaster risk reduction by developing specialised programmes tailored for primary schools. Caritas Serbia staff created awareness-raising materials on how to respond to natural disasters, including posters and colouring books, and organised hundreds of school workshops and numerous roundtable discussions in municipalities over the years.

With the start of the 2015 European migrant crisis, Caritas Serbia once again became active in a large-scale humanitarian response, providing relief items to over 100,000 refugees and migrants. This initial crisis led to a prolonged support, including the establishment of laundry services for refugees residing in the reception centres in Krnjaca and Presevo, and language and animation classes for children and adults in the centres in Bujanovac and Krnjača.

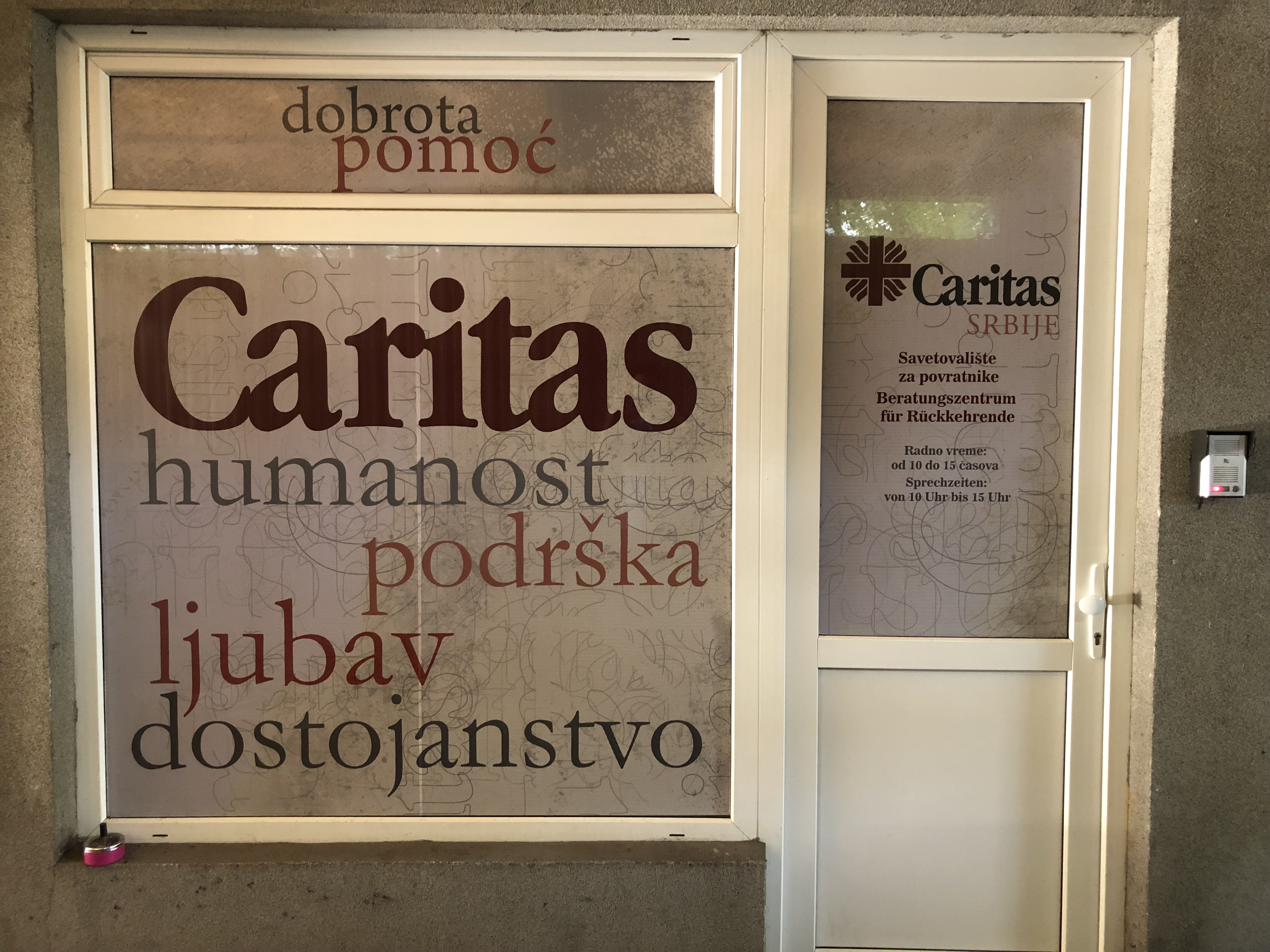
Counselling centre for returnees in Belgrade

In 2017, Caritas Serbia established a counselling centre in Belgrade for persons returning to Serbia after having left for Germany. They orient the returnees and provide guidance in order to facilitate their reintegration process into Serbian society.

In addition, Caritas Serbia fundraises for partner organisations responding to disasters abroad. Other important activities are the promotion of mental health and the process of deinstitutionalization, home care of the elderly, and social entrepreneurship.

== Structure ==
The structure of Caritas is the same as the structure of the Catholic Church in Serbia. Caritas Serbia consists of the national office as well as of 5 regional, autonomous Caritas organisations in Serbia. They work in three dioceses, one archdiocese and one eparchy. The diocesan Caritas organisations support people affected by poverty in Serbia and contribute therewith to social integration.

The five local organisations are:

- Caritas of the Archdiocese of Belgrade (Caritas Beogradske nadbiskupije)
- Caritas of the Diocese of Srijem (Biskupijski Caritas za Srijem)
- Caritas of the Diocese of Subotica (Biskupijski Caritas Subotica)
- Caritas of the Diocese of Zrenjanin (Biskupijski Caritas Zrenjanin)
- Caritas of the Greek Catholic Eparchy of Ruski Krstur (Caritas Krsturske grkokatoličke eparhije)

Despite being a Catholic organisation, Caritas Serbia provides aid and support to people in need regardless of their religious, national or any other affiliation.

== See also ==
- Catholic Church in Serbia
