= Caritas Malta =

Maltese Catholic social welfare organisation

- Fondazzjoni Caritas Malta
- Established: 11 November 1968; 57 years ago
- Founder: Victor Grech
- Type: Nonprofit
- Legal status: Foundation
- Purpose: social services
- Location: NANNU, Malta
- Coordinates: 35.88827°N 14.49648°E
- Region served: Malta
- Director: Anthony Gatt
- Affiliations: Caritas Europa, Caritas Internationalis
- Website: www.caritasmalta.org

Caritas Malta is a not-for-profit social welfare organisation in Malta. It is a service of the Catholic Church in Malta and a member of both Caritas Europa and Caritas Internationalis.

== History ==
Caritas Malta was formally founded in 1968 at the initiative of Archbishop Mikiel Gonzi and Bishop Nikol Cauchi, although charity work under the name of Caritas had already been carried out several years prior by volunteers involved with the Social Action Movement (MAS).

On 11 November 1968, the Caritas National Council was set up. Its objective was to coordinate and foster Catholic charitable activities and social assistance. It brought together different existing Catholic initiatives: the Social Development Committee (Social Action Movement), the Social Assistance Secretariat (Catholic Action), the Society of St. Vincent de Paul, St. Francis Guild for the Blind, St. Elizabeth Society for Needy Children, and the Gozo Diocesan Service. The first director was Rev. Fortunato Mizzi.

In early 1977, at the initiative of the Archbishop Joseph Mercieca, the Catholic Church set up secretariats for the different fields of pastoral action. One of them was the Secretariat for Diocesan Social and Charitable Action. It was created to strengthen the social services provided by Church institutions and to identify new such services to be developed. This objective was similar to that of the Caritas National Council, and the Council became a part of the new Secretariat. Victor Grech was appointed as the Archbishop's delegate for the Secretariat and also replaced Fortunato Mizzi as the director of the Caritas National Council. The statutes of the latter were revised that same year.

In May 1977, a Caritas Youth Volunteer Group was also established, starting with 20 volunteers while the number grew over time.

The work of Caritas Malta in the prevention of illegal drug abuse and the rehabilitation of drug users also started in the 1970s, but it was in 1985 that the first drug rehabilitation day programme was launched in Floriana with staff having received specialised training abroad. This work is now carried out by a separate branch of Caritas Malta, the Foundation for the Rehabilitation of Drug Abusers.

In 1996, the Caritas Malta Epilepsy Association (CMEA) was set up by voluntary workers to offer a better life for people with epilepsy in the country. It offers free training sessions to increase local awareness about epilepsy and to reduce stigma.

== Work ==
Caritas Malta provides a range of services to support vulnerable individuals across the country. These services include social work interventions, counselling sessions, and community educational programmes. Individuals can seek assistance through various channels, including in-person visits, phone calls, emails, or social media. Each case is evaluated by social workers, who determine the appropriate course of action based on the person's needs. Depending on the assessment, they may be referred to an internal social worker or counsellor, or directed to external professionals working with other NGOs or State agencies.

The Social Work and Counselling Unit offers support through various self-help and support groups. These groups cater to different needs, such as those for widowed or separated individuals, people seeking reintegration into society, and those struggling with addictions, including Alcoholics Anonymous and Gamblers Anonymous.

Caritas Malta is also involved in educational initiatives, particularly in schools, where it runs awareness programmes aimed at helping children and youth make healthy and constructive life choices. These programmes are designed to prevent the onset of destructive behaviours such as drug, alcohol, or technological addiction.

In addition to these services, Caritas Malta plays a crucial role in supporting and coordinating diaconia work within parishes. A wide array of initiatives, often led by volunteers and supported by professional staff, address immediate needs within local communities. These needs range from combating loneliness and providing mental health support to organising social activities for the elderly and offering basic necessities such as food and blankets.

A significant focus of Caritas Malta's work is on drug rehabilitation, with most of the staff working in this field. The organisation offers various programmes for men, women, and adolescents seeking recovery from drug addiction. In 2022, 765 individuals sought assistance from Caritas Malta to overcome drug addiction, with 50% of them seeking help for cocaine addiction. The organisation also provided residential services to 233 individuals and supported 491 relatives of those struggling with addiction.

Additional services include an employment assistance program to help individuals reintegrate into the workforce. In additional, Caritas Malta is active in the field of advocacy, regularly taking a stance on issues such as the cost of living for low-income families, the limitations of drug liberalisation, or the government spending on social services.

Internationally, the organisation fundraises for partner organisations responding to humanitarian disasters abroad.
