= Caritas Spain =

Catholic charity organization in Spain

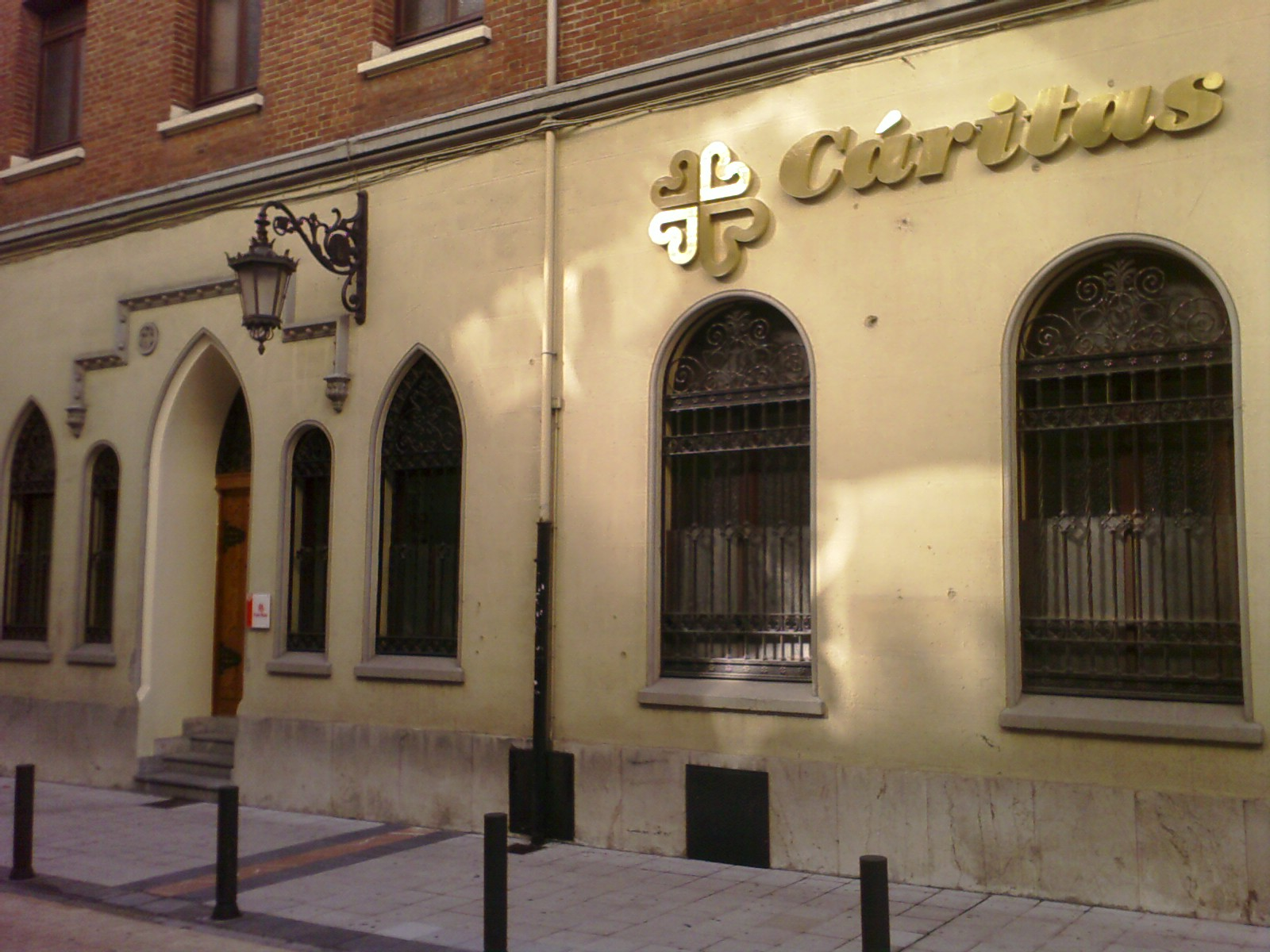
- Caritas site in Asturias
- Founded: 1947
- Purpose: Humanitarian aid, international development, social service
- Location: Spain
- Region served: Spain
- Key people: Rafael del Río, President
- Affiliations: Caritas Internationalis, Caritas Europa
- Website: www.caritas.es

Caritas Spain (Spanish: Cáritas Española) is the Catholic Church's official organization in Spain for charity and social relief, instituted by the Spanish Episcopal Conference.

On 9 March 1981 it was registered as a religious entity with Spain's Ministry of Justice.

== Organization ==
Caritas Spain is a Spanish confederation of Catholic relief, development, and social service organizations operating in Spain. It consists of 68 regional member organizations known as dioceses.

Its national headquarters is in Madrid; from there it provides general assistance to its dioceses.

== See also ==
- Caritas Internationalis
- Caritas Europa
