= Secours catholique =

French Catholic social aid organisation

- Abbreviation: SCCF
- Established: 8 September 1946
- Founder: Jean Rodhin and Assembly of Cardinals and Archbishops of France
- Type: Nonprofit
- Headquarters: 106 rue du Bac
- Location: Paris, France
- Coordinates: 48.856389°N 2.326389°E
- Origins: Catholic Social Teaching
- Region served: France and worldwide
- Fields: social work, social policy, humanitarian aid
- President: Véronique Devise
- Main organ: General assembly and Board of directors
- Affiliations: Caritas Europa, Caritas Internationalis
- Revenue: 147 million € (2022)
- Expenses: 154 million € (2022)
- Staff: 900 (2024)
- Volunteers: 58,000 (2024)
- Website: www.secours-catholique.org

Secours Catholique (French for 'Catholic relief'), also known as Secours Catholique – Caritas France, is a French not-for-profit organisation. It works to alleviate problems of poverty and exclusion of all sections of the population and seeks to promote social justice. Secours catholique is a service of the Catholic Church in France.

It is a member of both Caritas Europa and Caritas Internationalis.

== History ==
Secours Catholique was established in 1946 on the occasion of the Lourdes pilgrimage, with the return of 100,000 prisoners and deportees. It was founded by the French priest Jean Rodhain, former chaplain to prisoners of war, with the approval of the Assembly of Cardinals and Archbishops of France. His goal was to work with volunteers to support persons experiencing poverty without distinction of race, religion or nationality. In 1954, the organisation created its first Cité providing accommodation for workers from the Maghreb. Later, many other such establishments were created for people in precarious situations, the homeless, disabled people and migrants.

In 1962, Secours Catholique received reconnu d'utilité publique status ('recognised as being of public interest') which brought with it certain advantages related to donations.

In the 1970s and 1980s, in the context of rising unemployment and new precariousness, Secours Catholique urged the public authorities to initiate social justice policies to combat the causes of poverty.

Since then, the organisation has also provided national and international support to the people impacted by large scale emergencies in France and abroad, including to the victims of the 2004 Indian Ocean tsunami, the 2010 Haiti earthquake, the most vulnerable persons impacted by the COVID-19 pandemic in France and the Ukrainian refugees arriving in France after the 2022 Russian invasion of Ukraine.

== Structure and work ==
In France, Secours Catholique covers the whole country through its 3,500 local teams divided into 72 local offices called delegations. It carries out its activities with the help of 900 employees and 59,000 volunteers.

In addition to its work in France, Secours Catholique also work internally by supporting the development cooperation and humanitarian relief efforts of its partner organisations around the world. The organisation is one of the NGO partners of DG ECHO.
