= Caritas Germany =

German Catholic social welfare organisation

- Deutscher Caritasverband
- Abbreviation: DCV
- Predecessor: Charitasverband für das katholische Deutschland
- Established: November 9, 1897; 128 years ago
- Founder: Lorenz Werthmann
- Founded at: Cologne, Germany
- Type: Nonprofit
- Legal status: Registered association ("Eingetragener Verein")
- Headquarters: Karlstraße 40
- Location: Freiburg im Breisgau, Germany
- Coordinates: 48.00418°N 7.85667°E
- Origins: Catholic Social Teaching
- Region served: Germany and worldwide
- Fields: social work, social policy, humanitarian aid
- President: Eva Maria Welskop-Deffaa
- Affiliations: Caritas Europa, Caritas Internationalis, Aktion Mensch
- Revenue: €247.2 million (2022)
- Staff: 695,921 (2022)
- Volunteers: several 100,000 (2022)
- Students: 46,458 (2022)
- Website: www.caritas.de

The Deutscher Caritasverband ('German Caritas Association'), also sometimes referred to as Caritas Deutschland and internationally known as Caritas Germany, is a German Catholic not-for-profit organisation and social service provider. It is the largest welfare organisation and largest private employer in Germany.

It is a member of both Caritas Europa and Caritas Internationalis.

== Structure and work ==
Caritas Germany is the umbrella organisation for the 27 diocesan Caritas organisations and the recognised central specialist associations. It is represented by the President, who is elected by the Assembly of Delegates for a six-year term. A full-time board of three to five members, chaired by the president, is responsible for the management of the organisation. The diocesan Caritas associations are organised on a decentralised basis, i.e. they are legally independent. They are subject to the diocesan structure within the Catholic Church.

Caritas Germany is the largest social employer in the country with around 695,000 employees, 80% of which are women, and several hundred thousand volunteers. They work in roughly 25,000 facilities all over the country.

The work includes general social counselling services (such as suicide prevention or drug counselling), elderly care, health and nursing care, food banks and soup kitchens, as well as programmes supporting struggling families, people with disabilities, youth, unemployed persons, migrants and refugees, homeless people, sex workers, and other support to vulnearable and excluded communities.

Caritas International is the foreign aid arm of the German Caritas Association. It supports partner organisations in the implementation of development and humanitarian projects in over 70 countries around the world. The organisation is one of the NGO partners of DG ECHO.

Caritas Germany is headquartered in Freiburg im Breisgau and maintains a representative office in Berlin as well as one in Brussels.
