= Caritas Italy =

Italian Catholic charity organization

- Caritas Italiana
- Established: 2 July 1971; 54 years ago
- Founder: Episcopal Conference of Italy
- Type: Nonprofit
- Tax ID no.: 80102590587
- Purpose: social services, humanitarian relief, development aid, advocacy
- Location: Via Aurelia 796, Rome, Italy
- Coordinates: 41.8898°N 12.4077°E
- President: Archbishop Carlo Roberto Maria Redaelli
- Website: www.caritas.it

Caritas Italy (Italian: Caritas Italiana) is an Italian charitable organisation.

It was established by the Italian Bishops' Conference to promote overall human development, social justice, and peace, especially focusing on helping the poorest members of society. Caritas Italy is a member of both Caritas Internationalis and of Caritas Europa.

== History ==
In 1970 Pope Paul VI dissolved the Italian Pontificia Opera Missionaria (POA, Pontifical Missionary Work), a charity that had been supported by American Roman Catholics and which reported directly to the Apostolic See. It had managed charity work in Italy during the two World Wars and in the early postwar period.

On 14 November 1970, at the seventh General Assembly of the Episcopal Conference of Italy (C.E.I.) the papal recommendations were approved. With decree number 1727/71 of 2 July 1971, the C.E.I. approved the first statute of the diocesan Caritas of Italy, in charge of the Church's charitable and relief activities.

On 28 September 1972, the first national meeting of the diocesan Caritas was held. Three years later, Naples hosted the first national meeting between Church and lay people whose title was "Volunteering and human promotion", dedicated to the arising questions of the socalled Third Sector.

On 10 June 1977, Caritas Italiana and the Italian Ministry of Defence signed an agreement which added the former Pontificia Opera Missionaria to the list of entities where conscientious objectors could perform their civil service. The list was public and available at military districts.

In 2021, almost 1.5 million interventions were provided, and the organisation's listening centers gave support to 227,566 people (7.7% more than the previous year).
