= Caritas Moldova =

Moldovan Catholic social welfare and relief organisation

- Fundația de Binefacere Caritas Moldova
- Established: 10 May 1995; 30 years ago
- Founder: Anton Coșa
- Type: Nonprofit
- Registration no.: 1015620003945
- Legal status: Foundation
- Purpose: social services, humanitarian relief
- Location: Chișinău, Moldova
- Coordinates: 47.0043°N 28.8244°E
- Origins: Catholic Social Teaching
- Region served: Moldova
- Services: social services
- Official language: Romanian, English
- Director: Edward Lucaci
- President: Petru Ciobanu
- Affiliations: Caritas Europa, Caritas Internationalis
- Website: www.caritas.md

Caritas Moldova is a Catholic not-for-profit social welfare and humanitarian relief organisation in Moldova. Caritas Moldova is a member of both the Caritas Europa and the Caritas Internationalis networks.

== History ==
On 10 May 1995, the "religious catholic mission" Caritas Moldova was registered as the social department of the Roman Catholic Church in Moldova, at the initiative of the Apostolic Administrator for Moldova, Anton Coșa. It operated through the Caritas branches in local parishes, consisting of a local director - the parish priest - and volunteers. On 2 June 2015, Caritas Moldova was reorganised as a charitable foundation under the same name.

== Work ==
Caritas Moldova implements projects to support vulnerable persons at the margins of Moldovan society. This includes educational programmes for children in four centres located in Tiraspol, Rașcov, Petropavlovca and Zârnești, and activities to improve the quality of life of elderly people. They benefit from a wide range of medical and social services provided by professionals at the home of the elderly in four locations. Another vulnerable group are the Romani people who struggle with low literacy rates. Caritas Moldova supports them with their "Reintegration Through Literacy" project.

People who return from EU countries are targeted by the activities from Caritas Moldova who provides them with reintegration support.

After he Russian invasion of Ukraine in 2022, Caritas Moldova implemented large-scale relief projects to support the high number of Ukrainian refugees arriving in Moldova. This assistance consisted in cash and voucher support, accommodation, the provision of food and hygiene items and psychosocial and medical support. In 2022 alone, Caritas Moldova assisted 100,000 Ukrainian refugees, providing shelter, food, money and psychological support, and at least one hot meal a day to over 42,000 individuals in eight different national refugee centres. For this purpose, it received funding from other Caritas organisations around the world, as well as from institutional donors such as UNHCR.

Caritas Moldova's youth division "Young Caritas" organised activities for children and teenagers, including summer camps.

In its humanitarian work, Caritas Moldova applies the Sphere Standards.

Caritas Czech Republic has also been active in Moldova since 2004, through its own country office which opened in 2017. The American Caritas, Catholic Relief Services, is present in the country with its own country office as well.
