= Alceoni Berkenbrock =

Brazilian Catholic priest

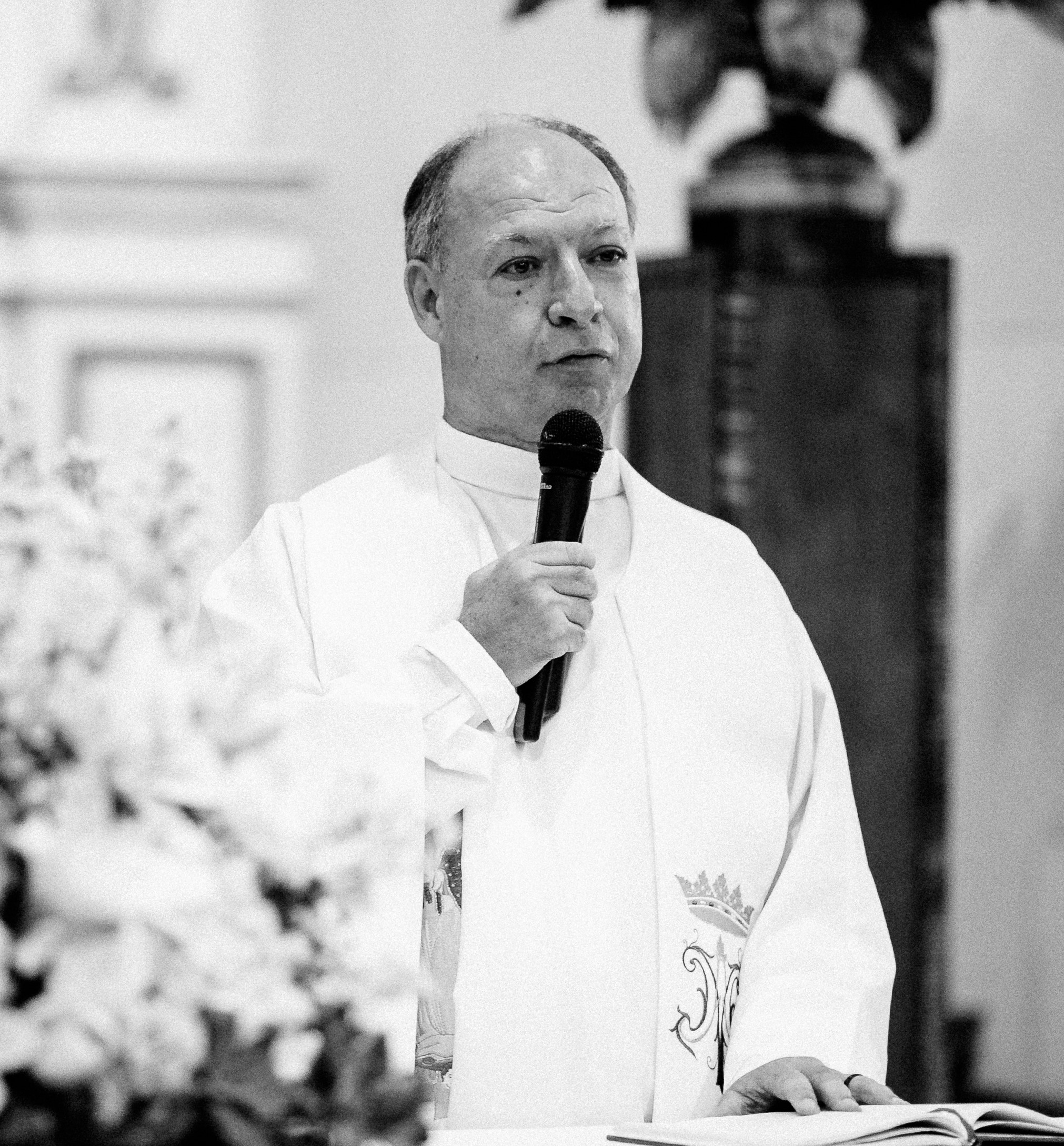
Pe. Alceoni Berkenbrock

Fr. Alceoni Berkenbrock (born September 30, 1963, Florianópolis) is a Brazilian writer and catholic priest.

== Biography ==
The youngest son of José Berkenbrock and Luci Berkenbrock, brother of Arno and Zioni. He carried out the initial studies in São José (SC). In 1986, he moved to Brusque to study at the Seminary of Azambuja. Ordained Deacon on April 24, 1993, and Presbyter on July 10 of the same year, in the Mother Church of the Santa Cruz Parish.

== Functions ==
The first occupation was in 1993 as vicar of the parish of Santo Antônio, in the district of Campinas (São José – SC). He then became parish priest of the Parish of Nossa Senhora Aparecida, in the Procasa district. In 1999, he took over the São João Batista Parish in Itajaí. In 2002, Alceoni became Spiritual Director and Vicar at the Shrine of Azambuja. In 2007, he moved to Garopaba to be the Parish Priest of the São Joaquim Parish.

He returned to São José in 2012, where he has since served as Parish Priest of the Sagrados Corações de Jesus Parish in Barreiros. And Vicar General of Forania São José (Barreiros) since 2015.

== Pana project ==
The project is a partnership between Caritas Switzerland and Caritas Brazil in the framework of refugee immigration and humanitarian assistance. In the language of the Warao people, indigenous ethnicity of Venezuelan territory, pana means friend, partner.

Brazil has received a much smaller number of refugees than other South American nations, especially those that do not have a border with Venezuela, such as Peru, which received 354,000 people until July 2018. Chile had 105,700 refugees, and Argentina had 95,000 refugees.

== Books ==
- 365 Dias Rezando pelas Vocações (2016)

== Awards ==
- Freedom of the City of Garopaba (SC).

== See also ==
- Fr. Alcione Berkenbrock Institute: Official website
