= Caritas Ecuador =

Catholic charity organisation

- Cáritas Ecuador
- Established: 1961
- Type: Nonprofit
- Purpose: development aid, humanitarian aid, social services
- Location: Quito, Ecuador
- Coordinates: 0.19726°S 78.49910°W
- Origins: Catholic Social Teaching
- Region served: Ecuador
- President: Antonio Crameri
- Affiliations: Caritas Internationalis, Caritas Latin America and Caribbean
- Website: www.caritasecuador.org

Caritas Ecuador (Spanish: Cáritas Ecuador, also known as Pastoral Social Cáritas Ecuador) is an Ecuadorian nonprofit organisation established in 1961. It is the official aid organisation of the Catholic Church in Ecuador.

The organisation is a member of the global Caritas Internationalis confederation and of Caritas Latin America and Caribbean.

== History ==
Caritas Ecuador was founded as the social arm of the Catholic Church in Ecuador in 1961.

== Work ==
The organisation works in a number of sectors, including in food security by implementing agricultural programmes, as well as in the fields of healthcare, environmental action, and support to migrants and refugees. Caritas also provides general support to persons living in poverty.

During the COVID-19 pandemic in Ecuador, Caritas assisted more than 600,000 people in the country.

To implement its work, Caritas Ecuador collaborates with numerous partners, including government and international cooperation organisations, universities, private companies, UN agencies such as UNHCR and FAO, and other national and international NGOs.

== Structure ==
It consists of a national office and of 25 diocesan Caritas organisations:

- Coastal Zone (Zona Costa):
  - Caritas Esmeralda
  - Caritas Porto Viejo
  - Caritas Santo Domingo
  - Caritas Babahoyo
  - Caritas Guayaquil
  - Caritas San Jacinto
  - Caritas Daule
  - Cáritas Galápagos
- Northern Zone (Zona Norte):
  - Caritas Tulcán
  - Caritas Ibarra
  - Caritas Quito
- Central Highlands Zone (Zona Sierra Centro):
  - Caritas Latacunga
  - Caritas Guaranda
  - Caritas Ambato
  - Caritas Riobamba
- Southern Zone (Zona Sur):
  - Caritas Azogues
  - Caritas Cuenca
  - Caritas Machala
  - Caritas Loja
  - Caritas Zomara
- Eastern Zone (Zona Oriente):
  - Caritas Sucumbios
  - Caritas Napo
  - Caritas Aguarico
  - Caritas Puyo
  - Caritas Méndez
