= Caritas Colombia =

Colombian Catholic charity organisation

- Pastoral Social Cáritas Colombiana
- Established: 1956 (creation); 1977 (legal registration)
- Type: Nonprofit
- Purpose: development aid, humanitarian aid, social services
- Headquarters: Cra. 58 No. 80 87, Barrios Unidos
- Location: Bogotá, Colombia
- Coordinates: 4.68290°N 74.07363°W
- Origins: Catholic Social Teaching
- Region served: Colombia
- Secretary General: Rafael Martín Castillo Torres
- President: Luis José Rueda Aparicio
- Affiliations: Caritas Internationalis, Caritas Latin America and Caribbean
- Revenue: COP 65,719,026,510
- Website: caritascolombiana.org

Caritas Colombia (Spanish: Cáritas Colombiana, officially Pastoral Social Cáritas Colombiana) is a Colombian nonprofit organisation. It is the official aid organisation of the Catholic Church in Colombia.

The organisation is a member of the global Caritas Internationalis confederation and of Caritas Latin America and Caribbean.

Caritas Colombia is a network of different structures. The national secretariat is known as Secretariado Nacional de Pastoral Social (SNPS).

== Background ==
Since 1913, the Colombian Episcopal Conference has promoted social welfare work in the country. In 1956, during the civil war, the Bishops decided to establish Caritas Colombia as the coordinating body for Catholic social work. It was decided that this body was to report to the Social Pastoral and Charitable Commission of the Bishops' Conference.

During its first years of existence, Caritas' work focused on food distributions to people in need in parishes. In the 1960s, Caritas Colombia started creating special "food houses". In the backdrop of evolving political dynamics within the country, new challenges emerged; in rural areas, the ongoing clash between guerrilla groups and armed forces prompted the Church to take initiatives to support rural families, including helping them to increase their agricultural output.

On 4 August 1977, the National Secretariat of Social Pastoral (SNPS) was legally created to coordinate pastoral care activities and promote integral human development. Around that time, the organisation also began supporting those affected by natural disasters and displacement. Caritas Colombia was involved in the relief and reconstruction efforts for the victims of the Popayán earthquake and the victims of the 1985 Armero tragedy.

In 1982, Caritas Colombia launched its first fundraising campaign during Lent. In the 1990s, urban violence caused by drug trafficking became a major issue in the country, to which the organisation adapted by starting to implement peacebuilding projects and being involved in truth and reconciliation initiatives. At the same time, it continued to provide humanitarian aid to populations affected by natural disasters. In 1996, it co-founded the Working Group for Colombia (GTC) to strengthen the SNPS's work in peacebuilding and reconciliation. In 2000, it convened the first National Congress of Reconciliation.

== Structure and work ==
The organisation is structured into 10 regions grouping 13 archdioceses, 52 dioceses, 10 apostolic vicariates and one military ordinariate.

In 2023, Caritas Colombia implemented 62 projects in 51 geographical areas of ecclesiastical jurisdictions, with a total budget of almost 66 billion Colombian peso.
