= Caritas Brazil =

Brazilian Catholic humanitarian organisation

- Cáritas Brasileira
- Established: 12 November 1956; 69 years ago
- Founder: Episcopal Conference of Brazil
- Type: Nonprofit
- Purpose: social welfare, social justice
- Location: Brasília, Brazil
- Coordinates: 15.7948°S 47.8844°W
- Services: social services, humanitarian aid
- Affiliations: Caritas Internationalis, Caritas Latin America and Caribbean
- Website: caritas.org.br

Caritas Brazil (Portuguese: Cáritas Brasileira) is a not-for-profit social welfare organisation in Brazil. It is a service of the Catholic Church in Brazil and a member of both Caritas Internationalis and Caritas Latin America and Caribbean.

== History and work ==
Caritas Brasil was founded in 1956 at the initiative of Bishop Hélder Câmara, who was at the time the Secretary-General of the National Conference of Bishops of Brazil (CNBB). It operates as a federation of 198 member organisations, structured into 13 regional divisions and four national articulations. Its work spans 450 municipalities, focusing on supporting the most impoverished communities. The organisation and its members implement their work through more than 15,000 workers, most of whom are volunteers.

Initially centred on informal charitable practices guided by Christian principles, Caritas began professionalising its activities in the 1970s. This shift included specialised training for regional and diocesan staff, which laid the groundwork for more structured programmes in the 1980s and 1990s. Key initiatives include technical schools and training sessions aimed at enhancing methodologies for sustainable development.

A cornerstone of its efforts is the promotion of the Economia Popular Solidária (solidarity economy). This approach fosters small-scale community projects (PACs) that receive financial, technical, and strategic support to drive local development and improve livelihoods. In the 1990s, evaluations of these projects highlighted their broader societal impact, prompting partnerships with public policies to strengthen cooperative enterprises and expand economic opportunities.

Caritas work encompasses three primary mechanisms: structured programmes, public mobilisation, and the National Solidarity Fund. These initiatives target various areas, such as food security, risk management, youth empowerment, and refugee support.
