= Caritas Luxembourg =

Social welfare and humanitarian relief organisation in Luxembourg

- Type: Nonprofit
- Headquarters: 29, rue Michel Welter
- Location: Luxembourg City, Luxembourg
- Coordinates: 49.60388°N 6.12645°E
- Origins: Catholic Social Teaching
- Region served: Luxembourg and worldwide
- Fields: social work, development aid, humanitarian aid
- Secretary General: Marc Crochet
- President: Marie-Josée Jacobs
- Main organ: board of directors
- Affiliations: Caritas Europa, Caritas Internationalis
- Budget: €113,587,771.78 (2022)
- Staff: 1,041 (2022)
- Volunteers: 368 (2022)
- Students: 2015 (2022)
- Website: www.caritas.lu

Caritas Luxembourg (informally in Luxembourgish: Caritas Lëtzebuerg) is the name of a range of nonprofit organisations operating in Luxembourg. They are grouped together under the umbrella of the Caritas Luxembourg Confederation (French: Confédération Caritas Luxembourg). These organisations work across various sectors in Luxembourg, focusing on vulnerable populations including migrants, refugees, the homeless and other individuals living in poverty. Other programmes focus on children and youth. A department is dedicated to the implementation of international cooperation and humanitarian projects abroad.

== History ==
The first Caritas organisations were founded in the wider region around Luxembourg at the turn of 20th century, the first one being the German Caritas organisation in 1897, followed by Caritas Switzerland in 1901, Caritas Strasbourg in 1902 and Caritas Metz in 1903.

These initiatives promoted the idea of federating the charity work of the Catholic Church also in Luxembourg. Several Luxembourgers were member of the German Caritas including Bishop Jean Joseph Koppes in 1909/1910. Caritas Luxembourg was finally established in 1932.

== Structure ==
Caritas Luxembourg is not a single legal entity but comprises four separate legal entities, all bearing the name Caritas. These entities share the same values and work complementarily. Each organisation has its own management and governance structure. Representatives from these four organizations convene in the informal Governing Board of Caritas Luxembourg (Conseil de Gouvernance de Caritas Luxembourg), presided over by Marie-Josée Jacobs, a former government minister.

The four legal entities are:

- Fondation Caritas Luxembourg (FCL): a foundation working with migrants and refugees in Luxembourg, and implementing international cooperation and humanitarian projects abroad.
- Caritas Accueil et Solidarité (CAS): an association working with unhoused people, people in poverty.
- Caritas Jeunes et Familles: an association and a social service provider for the Ministry of Education operating day care centres for children, youth work, and the youth group YoungCaritas.
- Caritas Enfants et Familles: an association operating a daycare centre.

In 2022, the four organisations employed more than 1,000 employees and worked with over 360 volunteers and 200 interns and trainees.

== Embezzlement scandal ==
On 19 July 2024, national media reported that Caritas lodged a police complaint against financial irregularities in FCL and CAS, claiming that one high-ranking employee who had fled abroad had embezzled more than 60 million euro. The media depicted the situation as a critical threat to the organisation's existence. Described as a "CEO Scam" by Luxembourg police, the accused employee allegedly bypassed authorization procedures to procure payment of fake invoices. The scandal has been described as an example of "executive phishing", a form of cyber crime that is becoming increasingly more common in Luxembourg.

In September 2024, due mainly to public outcry over the scandal, Caritas Luxembourg shuttered its numerous overseas aid projects.

== Work ==
In 2022, Caritas Luxembourg assisted more than 31,000 persons in Luxembourg. Core initiatives are its four social grocery stores and its Kleederstuffen ('clothing halls'), providing essential support to people for basic needs like food, clothing, and heating. The organisation supports thousands of individuals in integrating through work or occupation, promoting self-sufficiency and stability, and provides socio-educational support in more than 20 accommodation centres for asylum seekers and refugees.

Caritas Luxembourg also assists people in securing emergency accommodation and housing. This includes operating the Wanteraktioun ('winter action') night shelter, operate together with the Luxembourg Red Cross and Inter-Actions, the Ulysse Center, and two night stops dedicated to homeless individuals. Additionally, Caritas Luxembourg operates two shelters specifically for victims of human trafficking and oversees 242 social housing units, providing shelter to approximately 820 individuals.

Another large target group are children and young people, for whom Caritas offers a range of services such as 23 nurseries and daycare centres, along with three youth centers. Dedicated support services like the counselling service Kanner-JugendTelefon are complemented by recreational activities such as summer camps and other youth activities.

Internationally, Caritas Luxembourg engages in development aid and humanitarian projects across several countries, addressing humanitarian challenges in places like South Sudan, Syria and Ukraine. The organisation is one of the NGO partners of DG ECHO. This action is complemented by the work of its advocacy programme Plaidons responsable ('Let's plead responsible') which work on campaigns such as "Rethink Your Clothes".
