= Special Jurisdiction for Peace =

Colombian transitional justice mechanism

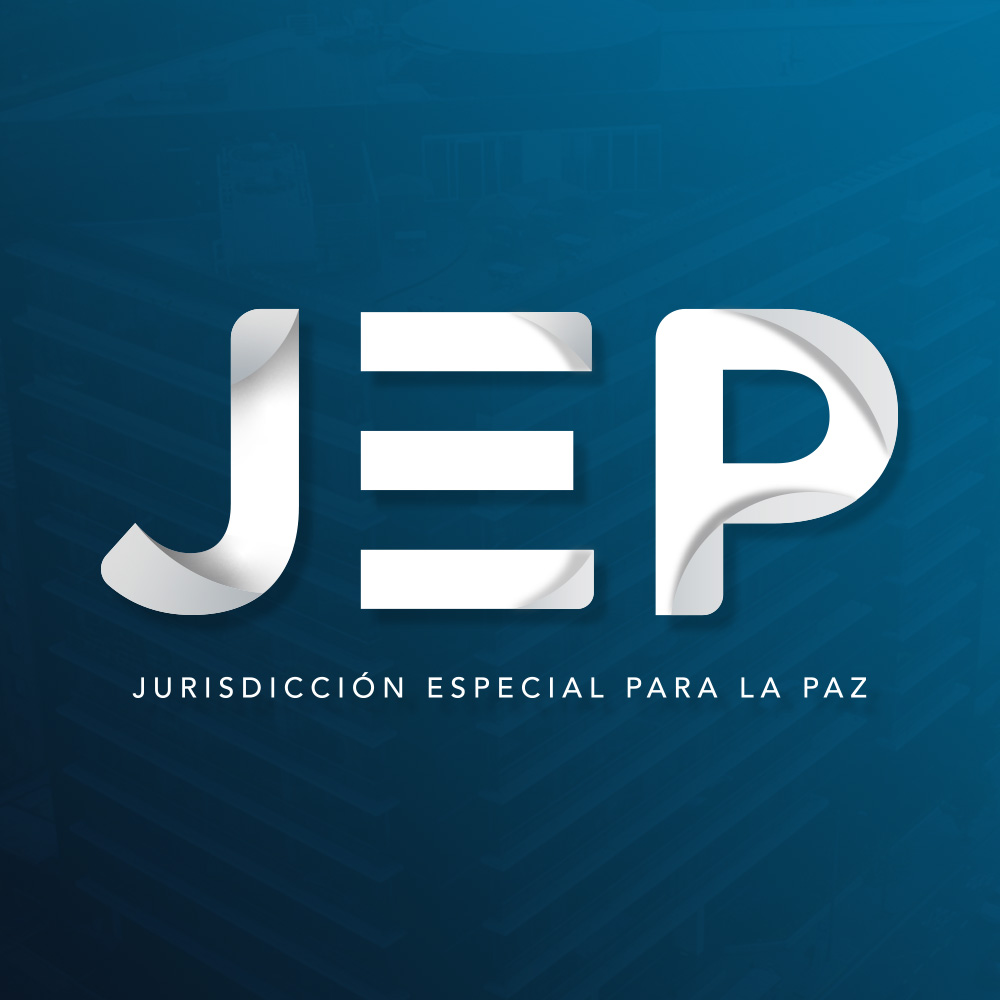
Logo of the Special Jurisdiction for Peace

The Special Jurisdiction for Peace (in Spanish: Jurisdicción Especial para la Paz, JEP), also known as Special Justice for Peace, is the Colombian transitional justice mechanism through which FARC members, members of the Public Force and third parties who have participated in the Colombian armed conflict are investigated and put on trial.

The JEP, justice component of the Comprehensive System of Truth, Justice, Reparation and Non-Repetition, addresses crimes committed before the November 24, 2016 signing of the peace agreements between the government of Juan Manuel Santos and the FARC guerrillas. The JEP was approved in the Senate in March 2017 and has been in force in Colombia since then.

Its creation was agreed by the government of Juan Manuel Santos and the FARC guerrillas in the framework of the peace agreements signed in Havana as an accountability system with the objective mainly of satisfying the rights of the victims, with the task to clarify "in the context and because of the armed conflict, in particular the most serious and representative crimes" to put an end to more than half a century of armed conflict.

This agreement accepts that there are crimes committed in the context and because of the armed conflict that are so serious that they cannot be subject to amnesties and pardons, and that the transition from the armed conflict to peace in Colombia will be made by guaranteeing the right to Victims to justice.

== Objectives ==
The objectives of the Jurisdiction are to satisfy the victims' right to justice, offer truth to Colombian society, protect the rights of the victims, contribute to the achievement of a stable and lasting peace, and adopt decisions that grant full legal certainty to those they participated directly or indirectly in the internal armed conflict, regarding facts committed in the context and because of it, in particular those that constitute serious violations of International Humanitarian Law or serious violations of Human Rights.

It is an accountability system that, in addition, will have the task of clarifying and punishing the conduct committed “ in the context and because of the armed conflict, in particular the most serious and representative crimes”. The agreement accepts that there are crimes committed in the middle of the war that "are so serious that they cannot be subject to amnesties and pardons".

According to the Colombian High Commissioner for Peace, the objectives of the JEP are:

- Satisfy the right of victims to justice
- Offer truth to Colombian society
- Contribute to the reparation of victims
- Contribute to fighting impunity
- Adopt decisions that grant full legal certainty to those who participated directly or indirectly in the armed conflict, regarding facts committed in the context and because of it.
- Contribute to the achievement of a stable and lasting peace

== Composition ==
The JEP will be composed of mainly Colombian magistrates, notwithstanding a minority participation of foreigners, and will consist of five bodies and an Executive Secretariat:

- The Court for Peace (Tribunal para la Paz in Spanish), which will be composed of different sections responsible for assessing recognized behaviors, those responsible, sanctions and the manner in which they will be executed. They must also verify compliance with their sentences. The accusations of the Investigation Unit Chamber and appeals on the decisions of the other chambers and their own sections will arrive to the court. In the cases of persons who have served a sentence in ordinary justice, it will be this authority who reviews the sentences and their compliance.
- Chamber of Recognition of Truth and Responsibility and Determination of Facts and Conducts (Sala de Reconocimiento de Verdad y Responsabilidad y de Determinación de los Hechos y Conductas in Spanish): in charge of receiving all the information and acknowledgments of responsibility in facts of the armed conflict, as noted by the High Commissioner for Peace. It must also identify the most serious and representative cases. Even so, their competence is not limited to them.
- Amnesty and pardon chamber (Sala de Amnistía e Indulto in Spanish): to decide whether or not to grant amnesty or pardon, when it comes to cases and people who can aspire to it. In the case of individuals who qualify for either of these two categories, they should refer the cases to the first chamber.
- Juridical Situation Definition Chamber (Sala de Definición de Situaciones Jurídicas in Spanish): it has the responsibility to define what will happen to the legal situation of those who are not subject to amnesty or pardon nor are included in the resolutions issued by the Truth and Accountability Recognition Chamber.
- Investigation and Accusation Unit Chamber (Sala de Unidad de Investigación y Acusación in Spanish): when a case is presented in which the person or those involved do not recognize their responsibility, this will be the authority in charge of investigating and, if there is merit, bringing the proceedings before the Court for Peace. In case it consider that it is not necessary to accuse or investigate, it will send the files to the Legal Situation Chamber or to the Amnesty and Pardon Chamber. In addition to having a forensic technical investigation team, it must have a special investigation team for cases of sexual violence.
- Executive Secretariat (Secretaría Ejecutiva in Spanish): responsible for the administration, management and execution of the resources of the JEP.

== Application ==
The JEP applies to all those who, having participated directly or indirectly in the armed conflict, committed crimes in the context and because of it. In this sense, the Jurisdiction will apply to:

- Members of guerrilla groups that sign a final peace agreement with the Government, once they have left their weapons.
- State agents who have committed crimes in the context and because of the armed conflict.
- Persons who, without being part of the armed organizations or groups, have participated indirectly (funders or collaborators) in the armed conflict and have been responsible for committing the most serious and representative crimes.

On 16 September 2025, the JEP issued its first rulings on war crimes cases it handled, convicting seven former FARC leaders for the kidnapping of 21,000 people during the conflict and sentencing them to eight years of rehabilitation and reparations work. On 18 September, it ordered 12 former officers of the Colombian military to do eight years of rehabilitation and reparations work for their role in the killings of 135 civilians falsely accused of being rebels during the conflict.

== Criticism ==
Since its establishment, the JEP has been questioned about the cases it investigates. The cases include alleged crimes against humanity related to the armed conflict with the FARC. In particular, the right-wing Democratic Center political party (chaired by former president and senator Álvaro Uribe) has maintained that amnesty should not be offered in heinous crimes and has complained that the JEP will "give impunity" to those who committed them. It is also questioned by some scandals that involve contracts without fulfilling requirements and bribes to JEP prosecutors to favor certain cases, so Uribe proposes to repeal this Special Peace Jurisdiction. However, several political, social, civil and even international sectors have rejected the heated criticism of the court, noting that the now senator does so in order to guarantee his impunity, since they consider that in several of the crimes now studied by the JEP, include him as a main actor.

The impartiality of the JEP has also been questioned. For the Colombian intellectual Renán Vega Cantor: "It is stated, for example, that the JEP has discovered the existence of more than 6,400 false positives. First of all, this is not really a breakthrough because it was already quite clear. Even the real number of false positives during the Uribe government is higher, something like double. But the fundamental comparative element is the way in which the actions of the FARC and the army are judged. In the case of the FARC, they are judged from the top, holding the leadership and the command responsible, and then extending downwards to the whole group. But in the case of false positives, individual cases are judged from below, without ever going back to the top. The highest authorities, like presidents, like Álvaro Uribe himself, will never be judged in this space. The JEP has become a tribunal to judge the FARC and to delegitimize their struggle in historical terms, stating that they were only kidnappers, extortionists, with no ideological or political motives to justify their insurrection. What concord can be drawn from this treatment?". A contributor to EJIL: Talk! argued that the JEP has violated "the principle of legality", prevented "parties and participants from challenging its decisions", and threatened "judicial impartiality".

== See also ==
- Truth and reconciliation in Colombia
