= St. Nicholas Orphanage =

Orphanage in Novosibirsk, Russia

Coordinates: 54°58′7″N 82°57′38″E

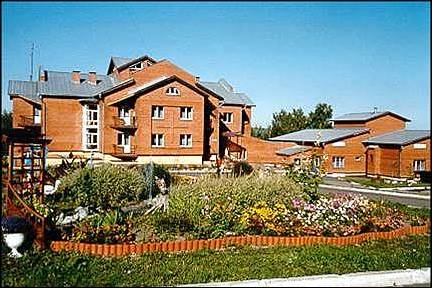
St. Nicholas Orphanage (Novosibirsk, Russia)

St. Nicholas Orphanage (Russian: Детский дом "Приют св. Николая") was the only Catholic orphanage in Siberia and the only non-state orphanage in this region of Russia. It was founded in Novosibirsk in 1996 by "Caritas" charity with the financial support of several international institutions.

St. Nicholas accommodated up to 50 children (boys and girls) ages 3–17 at a time. It employed 37 people, including six religious sisters of the Roman Catholic congregation of the Sisters of Saint Elizabeth.

The orphanage received national recognition for its social innovations. St. Nicholas became the first orphanage in Russia to provide support for the children's biological families. It was also one of the national leaders in assisting the orphanage graduates. St. Nicholas became one of the few Russian orphanages to start a regular program for the foreign student volunteers. The Theater Studio of the orphanage won the Grand Prix of the VII International Children's Theatre Festival in Moscow and other awards.

In 2015 the orphanage was closed down due to the general decrease in the number of orphans in Novosibirsk.
