= Caritas Congo =

Catholic charity organisation

- Established: 1960
- Type: Nonprofit
- Legal status: Association sans but lucratif ("non-profit association")
- Headquarters: 26 avenue Basoko Gombe
- Location: Kinshasa, Democratic Republic of the Congo
- Coordinates: 4.30889°S 15.32428°E
- Origins: Catholic Social Teaching
- Region served: Democratic Republic of the Congo
- Fields: development aid, humanitarian aid, education, health
- Secretary General: Edouard Makimba Milambo
- President: Mgr Dieudonné Uringi
- Affiliations: Caritas Internationalis, Caritas Africa
- Revenue: US$20.3 million (2023)
- Staff: 62 (national secretariat) (2023)
- Website: www.caritasdev.cd

Caritas Congo is a nonprofit organisation in the Democratic Republic of the Congo. It is the official aid organisation of the Congolese Catholic Church with a presence all over the country.

The organisation is a member of the global Caritas Internationalis confederation and of the regional Caritas Africa.

== Background and structure ==
Caritas Congo was founded in 1960 by the Congolese Bishops Conference (CENCO) with the mission to improving the lives of individuals and communities as a whole, according to the social doctrine of the Church. The organisation was registered in 1964 and restructured in 1993.

Caritas Congo consists as the national office, the Secrétariat exécutif ("Executive Secretariat"), and acts as a federation of 48 diocesan offices spread throughout the country. These organisations are called Caritas-Développement diocésaines ("Diocesan Caritas Development"). The 48 diocesan offices are divided into around 1,500 parish Caritas and more than 10,000 local units (cellules, "cells").

== Work ==
Caritas Congo is active in emergency relief while also providing medical services and implementing community development projects. In a context in which The DRC is sometimes described as a failed state, Caritas Congo provides more than 41% of all education services in the country.

The Executive Secretariat coordinates the work of all 48 diocesan Caritas organisations and represents them. It is also responsible for capacity strengthening and advocacy.

In 2023, Caritas Congo supported 2.5 million persons with a budget of US$20.3 million. The main areas of activity were prevention and emergency response projects, health promotion projects and projects promoting sustainable development.

== Literature ==
- Caritas Congo asbl: Origines, étapes historiques, réalisations, défis et perspectives, Dr. Bruni Miteyo Nyenge, ICREDES, Kinshasa, Montréal, Washington
