= Caritas Việt Nam =

Vietnamese Catholic charitable organisation

Caritas Việt Nam Ủy ban Bác ái Xã hội
- Founded: 1965; 2008 (re-established)
- Type: Roman Catholic relief Humanitarian aid
- Location: Ho Chi Minh City, Vietnam
- Coordinates: 10.83828°N 106.71404°E
- Region served: Vietnam
- Members: 26
- Key people: Bis. Dominic Nguyễn Chu Trinh; President; Fr. Vincent Vũ Ngọc Đồng, SDB; Secretary General
- Affiliations: Caritas Asia, Caritas Internationalis
- Website: www.caritasvietnam.org

Caritas Việt Nam (or Caritas Vietnam) is a Catholic charitable organization in Vietnam. It is also known as the Commission on Charity and Social Actions (Ủy ban Bác ái Xã hội) of the Catholic Bishops' Conference of Vietnam (CBCV).

Caritas Việt Nam is a member of the global Caritas International confederation.

== History ==
The CBCV of South Vietnam established Caritas in 1965 at the Central level. Diocesan Caritas organisations were also established around that time (Caritas Sài Gòn, Caritas Xuân Lộc, Caritas Huế, etc). Between 1965 and 1976, Caritas Việt Nam was active throughout the diocese in the south with Central Office located at #1 Tran Hoang Quan, District 5, Saigon (now #1 Nguyen Chi Thanh, District 5, Ho Chi Minh City). During the Vietnam War, Caritas Vietnam was actively helping the victims of war.

In June 1976, Caritas Việt Nam was ordered to dissolve by the government of Vietnam. This moratorium was lifted at the end of the 1990s. In 2001, the Vietnamese Bishops Conference established the Charitable and Social Commission, and on March 5, 2008, the official request to re-establish Caritas Việt Nam was sent. On July 2, 2008, the governments Religious Affairs Committee approved this request.

In 2011, Caritas Việt Nam became a full member of the global Caritas Internationalis confederation.

The work of Caritas Việt Nam consists of supporting persons living in poverty. The organisation runs programs for medical help supporting people with leprosy and people with disabilities, and also provides career training, scholarships to poor students and programs to help war victims return origin country.
