= Caritas Indonesia =

Indonesian Catholic relief and development organisation

- Yayasan Karina
- Established: 17 May 2006; 19 years ago
- Founder: Bishops' Conference of Indonesia
- Type: Nonprofit (foundation)
- Location: Jakarta, Indonesia
- Coordinates: 6.2014°S 106.8517°E
- Origins: Catholic Social Teaching
- Services: humanitarian aid, development aid, climate change adaptation
- Official language: Indonesian, English
- Affiliations: Caritas Internationalis, Caritas Asia, Humanitarian Forum Indonesia
- Website: www.karina.or.id

Caritas Indonesia, also known as the Karina Foundation (Indonesian: Yayasan Karina), is a not-for-profit humanitarian relief and development organisation in Indonesia. It is a service of the country's Catholic Church. Since its establishment, the organisation has been actively engaged in emergency response, disaster risk management, and strengthening community resilience in disaster-prone areas.

Caritas Indonesia is a member of both Caritas Internationalis and Caritas Asia, as well as of the Humanitarian Forum Indonesia.

== History and work ==
The Karina Foundation was officially established on 17 May 2006 as the official humanitarian agency of the Episcopal Conference of Indonesia. As it is the Indonesian member of Caritas Internationalis, it is also widely known as Caritas Indonesia. It serves as a hub for coordinating, facilitating, and supporting the humanitarian efforts of the Indonesian Catholic Church. Karina is a national organisation with its headquarters in Jakarta, but it collaborates closely with its network of 37 diocesan Caritas organisations and other socio-pastoral commissions to address humanitarian needs. One of the roles of the national office is to offer capacity-building programmes for diocesan Caritas staff and community facilitators.

Caritas Indonesia is known for distributing emergency response aid packages after natural disasters, such as earthquakes, tsunamis or volcano eruptions. In addition to humanitarian relief programmes, Caritas Indonesia is implementing different long-term programmes, including on the topics of community-managed disaster risk reduction, climate change adaptation, health and nutrition, as well as programmes supporting migrants and refugees and combatting human trafficking.
