= Caritas Internationalis =

Catholic relief, development and social service

- Formation: 12 December 1951; 74 years ago
- Founded at: Vatican City
- Headquarters: Palazzo San Callisto
- Coordinates: 41.8883°N 12.4700°E
- Origins: Catholic Social Teaching
- Region served: Worldwide
- Members: 162 national member organisations (2023)
- Official language: English, French, Spanish
- Secretary General: Alistair Dutton
- President: Cardinal Tarcisio Isao Kikuchi
- Vice-President: Kirsty Robertson
- Main organ: General Assembly; Representative Council (RepCo); Executive Board (ExBo)
- Affiliations: ICVA, SCHR, Sphere
- Website: www.caritas.org

Caritas Internationalis (Latin pronunciation: [kaː.ri.t̪as in̪.t̪er.nat̪.t̪͡s̪iˈɔː.na.lis]; lit. 'Charity International') is a confederation of 162 national Catholic relief, development, and social service organisations operating in over 200 countries and territories worldwide. The name Caritas Internationalis refers to both the global network of Caritas organisations and to its general secretariat based in Vatican City.

Collectively and individually, their missions are "to serve the poor and to promote charity and justice throughout the world". Caritas Internationalis is the second-largest international humanitarian aid network in the world after the International Red Cross and Red Crescent Movement.

== History ==
=== The beginning: Caritas Catholica ===
In 1891, Pope Leo XIII's encyclical Rerum novarum was published, addressing the condition of the working classes. Rerum Novarum is considered a foundational text of modern Catholic social teaching and provides the ideological background for the work of Caritas. In this context, the first Caritas organisations began to be established, with Caritas Germany being the very first, founded by Lorenz Werthmann in 1897 in Freiburg. In the following years, national Caritas organisations were set up in other countries, including Caritas Switzerland (1901), Caritas Austria (1903), Catholic Charities in the United States (1910) and Caritas Czechoslovakia (1922). The first Caritas at the diocesan level was set up in Strasbourg, which is now part of France but was then part of the German Empire, in 1903. In 1916, in the context of World War I, Caritas was recognised as the single official umbrella organisation for the German Catholic Church's relief operations. By 1922, all German dioceses had established their own Caritas association.

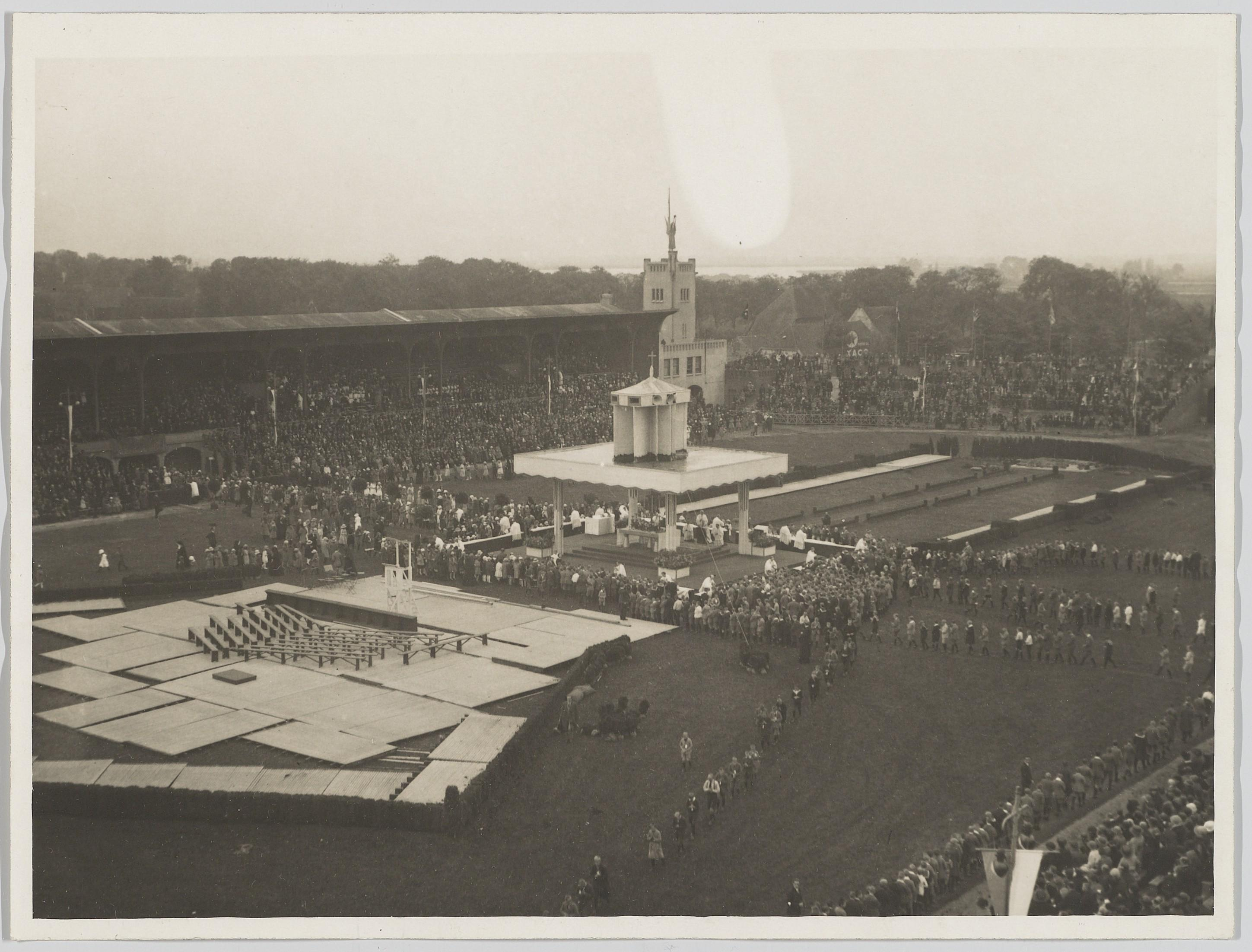
The 1924 Eucharistic Congress was a catalyst for the cross-border exchange and cooperation between Caritas organisations.

In July 1924, during the 27th International Eucharistic Congress in Amsterdam, an international conference on charity was held. This conference saw the participation of delegates from Austria, Belgium, Czechoslovakia, France, Germany, Hungary, Italy, the Netherlands, Russia, and Switzerland. The primary objective of the conference was to discuss Catholic charitable activities in various countries. These discussions revealed a plethora of charitable activities occurring, yet without effective cooperation and coordination.

As a result, most participants advocated for the establishment of a secretariat for charitable activities within each diocese. This centralised management would aim to consolidate various charitable efforts within a diocese, allowing for national and international collaboration. This network of organisations was subsequently named Caritas Catholica and formally established in 1928, with its headquarters at Caritas Switzerland in Lucerne. Wilhelm Kissling, the director of the Swiss Caritas, was appointed the first General Secretary, while Paul Müller-Sirnonis, the director of Caritas Alsace, became the inaugural president. The secretariat was organised into six specialised sections: youth, knowledge and teaching of charity, aid to the poor and to families, immigration and housing, assistance to the sick, and the fight against alcoholism.

The establishment of Caritas Catholica was reported to the Secretariat of State of the Holy See and the delegates of Caritas Catholica met every two years. Delegations were also present at some international conferences until the outbreak of the Second World War, when all activities came to a standstill.

A few national Caritas organisations were set up during or right after the war to provide and coordinate aid for the populations most in need, including the American Catholic Relief Services (1943), the French Secours catholique (1946) and Caritas Japan (1946).

=== Formal establishment in 1951 ===
The work of Caritas Catholica resumed in 1947, with the approval of the Secretariat of State. Two conferences were convened in Lucerne to help coordinate efforts and collaboration. Caritas was given a further endorsement when the Secretariat of State entrusted it with the official representation of all Catholic welfare organisations at the international level, especially at the United Nations. The Holy Year in 1950 saw the beginning of a union of Caritas organisations. Following a suggestion by Monsignor Giovanni Montini, then Substitute Secretary of State and later Pope Paul VI, a study week, with participants from 22 countries, was held in Rome to examine the problems of Christian Caritas work. As a result, the decision was made to set up an "International Conference of Catholic Charities".

On 21 October 1951, the Holy See approved the statutes of this international organisation ad experimentum and from 12 to 14 December 1951, the constitutive assembly of Caritas Internationalis took place. Founding members came from Caritas organisations in 13 countries: Austria, Belgium, Canada, Denmark, France, Germany, Italy, Luxembourg, Netherlands, Portugal, Spain, Switzerland, and the United States.

The first elected officials of the organisation were the Italian Bishop Ferdinando Baldelli, who served as President of Caritas Internationalis until 1962, and the German Carlo Bayer, who remained the Secretary General until 1970. In 1957, the International Conference of Catholic Charities changed its name to Caritas Internationalis to reflect the international presence of Caritas members on every continent.

=== Internationalisation throughout the 1950s and 1960s ===
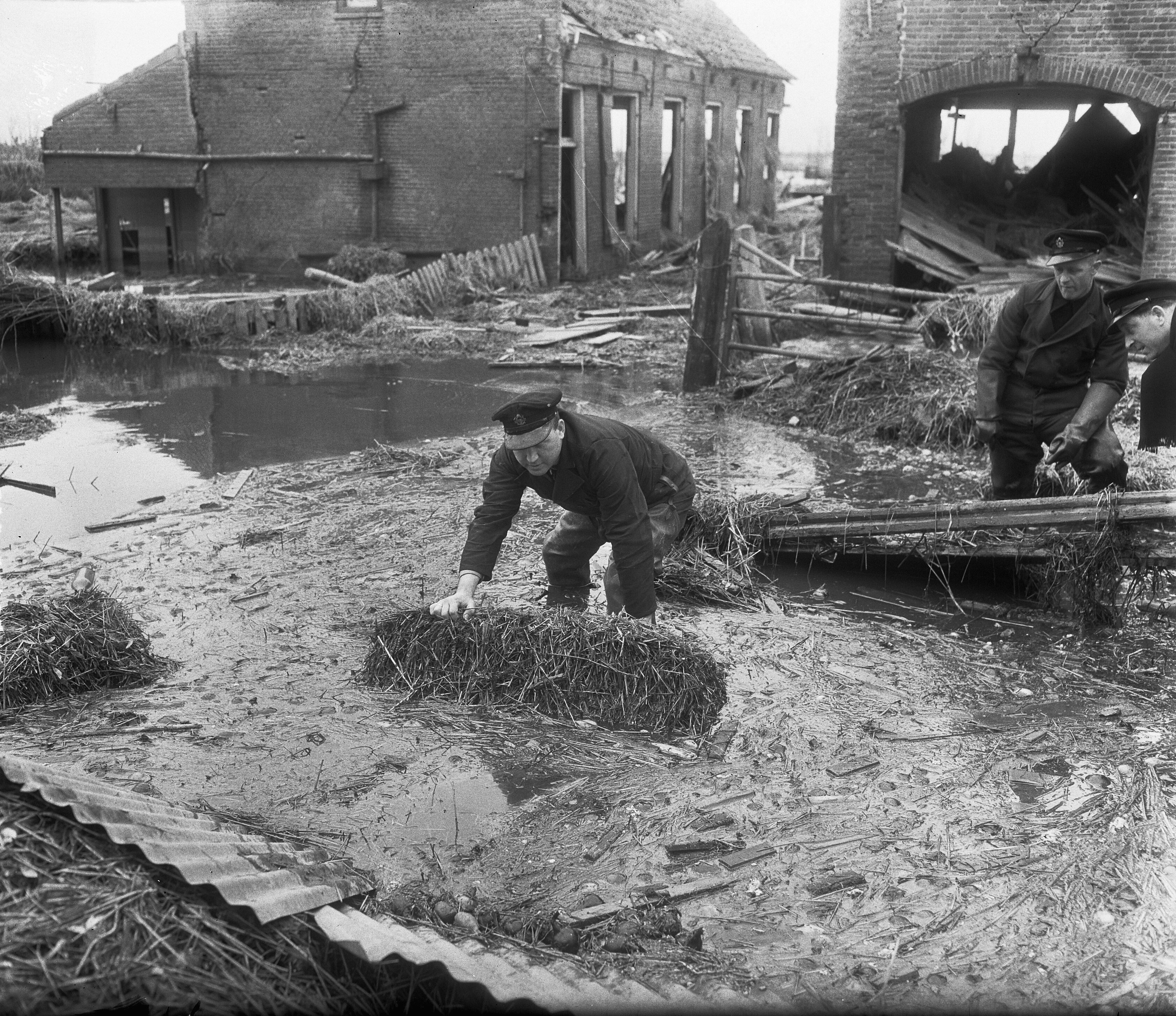
The North Sea flood of 1953 were a major emergency of the 1950s in which Caritas Internationalis coordinated the Catholic relief efforts.

Throughout the rest of the 1950s, new national Caritas organisations were founded and joined Caritas Internationalis, including Caritas Hong Kong in 1953, Caritas Syria in 1954, and Caritas Brazil and Caritas Colombia in 1956. At the same time, the French Secours catholique set up local sections in the French colonies in Africa, which would later become independent Caritas organisations, such as the current Caritas Burkina Faso, first established in 1956, or the current Caritas Madagascar in 1959. By 1957, Caritas Internationalis had 37 member organisations.

Caritas Internationalis coordinated the relief efforts of its members in response to emergencies in Europe, such as the 1953 floods in the Netherlands and Belgium, the 1953 Ionian earthquake, and the displacement of 200,000 Hungarian refugees after the 1956 uprising. In February 1957, Caritas Internationalis established an Emergency Aid Commission. Two years later, the Confederation also took its first steps in advocacy. The economic prosperity that many Western countries experienced highlighted that other parts of the world were still facing hunger and misery. In 1959, at the initiative of Cardinal Joseph Frings, the German bishops decided to launch a joint Lenten campaign to alleviate hunger, poverty and disease in what was then called the "Third World". The idea of Lenten campaigns and using the raised funds to implement charitable projects was adopted in many countries and remains a major fundraising tool for many Caritas organisations worldwide.

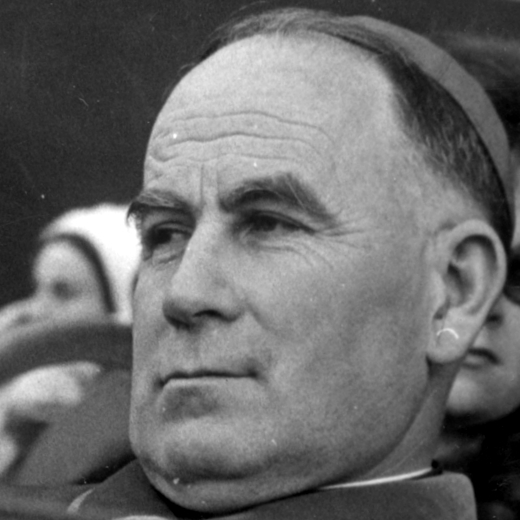
In 1962, the Chilean Cardinal Raúl Silva Henríquez was elected as president of Caritas Internationalis.

Caritas collaborated with the Food and Agriculture Organization on its five-year "Freedom from Hunger" campaign, launched in 1960. During its fifth General Assembly in 1960, the confederation called for locally based development aid in addition to emergency aid. The Confederation increasingly prioritized development as more Caritas organisations became development actors within their own countries. Consequently, a dedicated service for this purpose was established in the general secretariat in Rome. In 1962, the Chilean Cardinal Raúl Silva Henríquez was elected as president of Caritas Internationalis.

The Second Vatican Council (1962–1965) opened up the Church to the modern world. It emphasized the value of the work done by laypeople, called for dialogue with other religions, and urged Christians to promote the development of poorer regions and social justice among nations. In 1967, Pope Paul VI published Populorum progressio, an encyclical on the topic of "the development of peoples" which would become a foundational text for the work of Caritas Internationalis and its members. It prompted Catholic charities such as Caritas to contemplate their role within the Church and the contemporary world, reinforcing the notion that social action should be grounded in serving those most in need and that initiatives should be developed collaboratively with the communities.

That same year, CIDSE was established to coordinate the tasks identified by the Second Vatican Council as priorities for the Church, such as caring for the poor and oppressed and focusing on global justice. Since then, there has been close cooperation between Caritas Internationalis and CIDSE, with some Caritas member organisations also belonging to CIDSE.

Emergency relief efforts and coordination continued in the 1960s, including reconstruction after the 1962 Buin Zahra earthquake and the 1963 Skopje earthquake, as well as hunger and relief campaign after repeated famines in India and Pakistan. Caritas was a major humanitarian actor during the Biafran War (1967–1970) and Caritas Jerusalem was founded to coordinate the Catholic relief efforts after the 1967 Arab–Israeli War.

In 1969, following the International Year of Human Rights (1968), the General Assembly of Caritas Internationalis adopted a "Declaration on the Rights of Developing Nations". It supported the fundamental principled of the International Covenant on Civil and Political Rights and the International Covenant on Economic, Social and Cultural Rights. This marked the beginning of Caritas Internationalis adopting a more outward-facing advocacy approach, involving closer cooperation and engagement on the global stage through its UN delegations.

=== Professionalisation and further expansion in the 1970s and 1980s ===
On 19 July 1976, at the initiative of Pope Paul VI, Caritas Internationalis was granted civil juridical personality by the Vatican City State.

The seven regions that currently form the Caritas confederation were established in the 1970s to enhance its effectiveness and unity. Regional assemblies were created and held during the General Assemblies of the confederation. Their primary task was to develop regional work plans, elect regional presidents, and appoint commissions to support the overall work of the Caritas Internationalis general secretariat. This structure aimed to foster increased cooperation among organisations within the same region, ensuring a more cohesive and impactful approach to their humanitarian missions. Additionally, the first common manual on how to implement disaster aid was adopted in 1979.

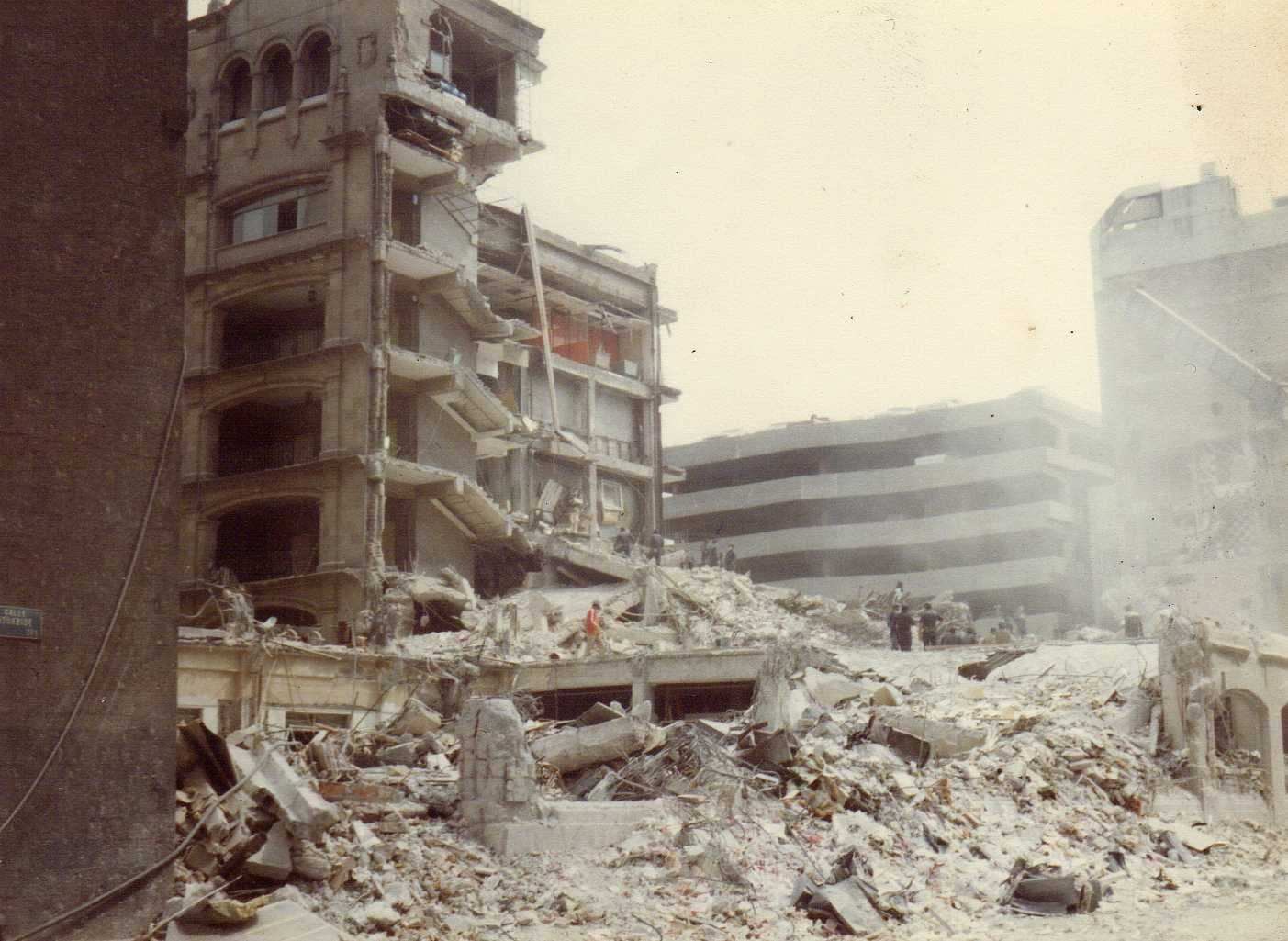
In the 1980s, Caritas Internationalis responded among other to the 1985 Mexico City earthquake.

In the 1970s and 1980s, the Confederation responded to a series of global humanitarian emergencies, including droughts in the Sahel, the influx of Vietnamese refugees arriving in Hong Kong starting in 1982, the 1985 Mexico City earthquake, the humanitarian emergency during the First Gulf War (1980–1988), the 1988 Bangladesh cyclone, and the extreme winter conditions in Europe at the end of the 1980s.

Caritas Lebanon became a major humanitarian actor during the Lebanese Civil War (1975–1990). Together with the Lutheran World Federation and the World Council of Churches, Caritas Internationalis formed the Churches Drought Action for Africa, later renamed Joint Relief Programme, to respond to the communities affected by the 1983–1985 famine in Ethiopia and later the victims of violence and hunger during the Eritrean War of Independence in the early 1990s.

In terms of advocacy, Caritas Internationalis focused on promoting the inclusion of persons with disabilities. Notably, the organisation participated in United Nations sessions aimed at assessing and implementing recommendations from the International Year of Disabled Persons (1981). Another significant area of focus was the promotion of women's participation in programmes. Caritas Internationalis played an active role in the 1980 World Conference on Women and, in 1983, Caritas Latin America organised a dedicated event in Panama focusing on the role of women in development.

In 1983, the Angolan Cardinal Alexandre do Nascimento succeeded the German priest Georg Hüssler as President of Caritas Internationalis.

=== The 1990s and 2000s marked by humanitarian emergencies ===
==== Humanitarian action ====
The 1990s and were marked by numerous humanitarian crises to which the Caritas confederation responded, including the Bosnian War (1991–1995), the famine in Somalia (1992, the Rwandan Genocide (1994) and the subsequent Great Lakes refugee crisis (1994–1996) and First Congo War (1996–1997), as well as the Kosovo War (1998–1999).

When the War in Darfur began in 2003, the British Caritas member CAFOD took the lead in coordinating the confederation's cooperation with Action by Churches Together. This joint initiative was known as the Darfur Emergency Response Operation (DERO). Caritas Internationalis also coordinated the confederation's response after the 2003 invasion of Iraq, with Caritas Iraq being one of the few humanitarian organisations operational in the country.

In the wake of the 2004 Indian Ocean earthquake and tsunami, Caritas Internationalis raised around US$450,000,000 for the initial emergency phase and the long-term recovery phase implemented by Caritas organisations in India, Indonesia, Sri Lanka, Thailand, and other countries. The latter phase included construction of earthquake-resistant houses and community infrastructure, job creation, and social assistance. After the 2010 Haiti earthquake, Caritas Internationalis and its member organisations provided humanitarian relief and rehabilitation support to over 1.5 million Haitians, using a budget of US$176,000,000.

When the Syrian civil war erupted in 2011, Caritas Syria, Caritas Lebanon, and Caritas Jordan were the three Caritas agencies providing the largest response in support of the internally-displaced persons and the refugees. Two years later, Caritas Internationalis member organisations responded to the Western African Ebola virus epidemic in Guinea, Sierra Leone, Liberia, and when Typhoon Haiyan devastated large parts of the country in November 2013, Caritas Philippines organised large-scale relief and reconstruction efforts and Caritas Bangladesh has been heavily involved in the support to the Rohingya refugees arriving from Myanmar in 2017. Caritas Lebanon was faced with an additional emergency when the 2020 Beirut explosion destroyed large parts of the city, and Caritas Congo has been a major humanitarian actor in the Democratic Republic of Congo for decades.

==== Other work ====
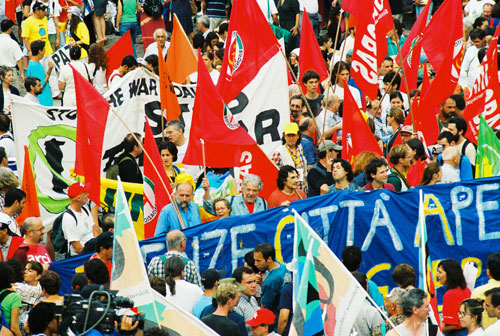
Caritas Internationalis was one of many organisations involved in the World Social Forum (here pictured in 2003 in Porto Alegre).

Nonetheless, Caritas also continued its work as social service provider and development actor around the world. For example Caritas Hong Kong, greatly expanded its educational and healthcare services. In Iraq, Caritas Iraq assisted more than 250,000 persons with food programmes alone and between 1995 and 2000. Caritas Austria expanded its support to children, people with disabilities, refugees, the homeless, the elderly, young mothers, people suffering from addictions, and the long-term unemployed.

Simultaneously, a new global crisis emerged with the spreading of HIV/AIDS. In 1999, Caritas Internationalis signed a memorandum of understanding with the Joint United Nations Programme on HIV/AIDS, agreeing to collaborating in raising awareness about the virus and caring for those affected.

In the late 1990s, Caritas also focused on peacebuilding, notably in Colombia where Caritas Colombia started implementing peacebuilding projects and became involved in truth and reconciliation initiatives. In 2000, it convened the first National Congress of Reconciliation.

In the 2000s, Caritas became involved in the World Social Forum, with 450 delegates from around 40 Caritas organisations participating in the Porto Alegre summit in 2003.

On 16 September 2004, Pope John Paul II granted public, juridical, and canonical personality to Caritas Internationalis, recognizing its formal status within the Church and its ability to operate with a greater degree of autonomy and authority. He also entrusted the task of "supervising and guiding the activity of Caritas Internationalis" to the Pontifical Council Cor Unum.

Caritas Internationalis launched its "HAART for Children" advocacy campaign in 2009, calling on governments and pharmaceutical companies to develop and provide child-friendly HIV and tuberculosis medicine. In November 2012, Pope Benedict XVI published the motu proprio Intima Ecclesiae natura, which focuses on the principles and guidelines for the charitable activities of the Catholic Church, which explicitly asks of the bishops to "encourage in every parish of his territory the creation of a local Caritas service or a similar body".

=== Since 2019: Controversies and organisational changes ===
In May 2019, the Dicastery for Promoting Integral Human Development became the new Vatican body overseeing the work of the Caritas Internationalis, following the integration of the previous oversight body, the Pontifical Council Cor Unum, into the Dicastery in 2017.

In November 2019, CNN reported that the Director of Caritas Central African Republic, a Belgian Salesian priest, had been convicted in Belgium in 2012 for child sexual abuse and possession of child pornography. CNN also identified two children in the Central African Republic who were allegedly abused by the priest. Following this report, the UN temporarily suspended its work with Caritas Central African Republic. Caritas Internationalis issues an apology, stating that it was "saddened and outraged" by the allegations of abuse and said it was working to improve its safeguarding policies towards children.

After the Russian invasion of Ukraine in early 2022, Caritas in Ukraine and the neighbouring countries implemented a large-scale response to support the internally displaced persons and refugees from Ukraine. In the first two years of the conflict, Caritas Ukraine and Caritas-Spes alone provided humanitarian aid to more than 3.8 million people in Ukraine.

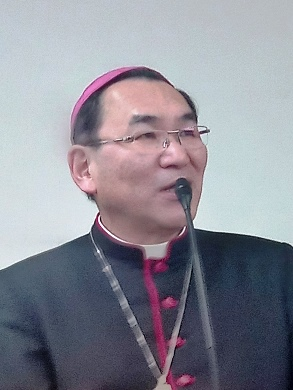
The Japanese Archbishop Tarcisio Isao Kikuchi was elected as president of Caritas Internationalis in 2023.

In November 2022, Pope Francis removed the secretary general and the entire leadership and governance team of Caritas Internationalis following an external investigation that uncovered significant management deficiencies impacting staff morale at the Caritas secretariat in Rome. An organisational consultant was appointed as a temporary administrator until elections were held for a new secretary-general in May 2023. These elections resulted in Alistair Dutton, previously the executive director of SCIAF (Caritas Scotland), winning the position of Secretary-General, and Archbishop of Tokyo Msgr. Tarcisio Isao Kikuchi being elected as President.

== Structure ==
Caritas Internationalis is a global confederation composed of national Caritas organisations from each country. As of 2024, the confederation has 162 members working in over 200 countries and territories. It is coordinated by a general secretariat located in the Palazzo San Callisto in Rome. The members are local faith-based organisation, usually established by the episcopal conferences in each country, fulfilling the social mission of the Catholic Church. While all member organisations are fully autonomous, they share the same mission and values. Therefore, the Caritas Internationalis secretariat does not wield direct authority over its members, such as the power to appoint or dismiss staff or impose programmes. Caritas operates according to the principle of subsidiarity. This also explains why the member organisations of Caritas Internationalis are only the national Caritas organisations. In most countries, the national Caritas is itself a federation of multiple Caritas organisations at diocesan level, which in turn can be further subdivided into different parish Caritas organisations.

The confederation is divided into seven regions: Caritas Africa (with a secretariat based in Lomé, Togo), Caritas Asia (Bangkok, Thailand), Caritas Europa (Brussels, Belgium), Caritas Middle East and North Africa (Beirut, Lebanon), Caritas North America (with a decentralised secretriat), Caritas Oceania (with a decentralised secretariat), and Caritas Latin America and Caribbean (San José, Costa Rica).

Some member organisations of Caritas Internationalis focus solely on domestic social welfare, such as Caritas Moldova or Caritas Singapore, while others, particularly in the Western world, operate internationally, like Cordaid from the Netherlands or Trócaire from Ireland, which specialize in international development and humanitarian aid. Caritas Spain, Caritas Poland, and Caritas Luxembourg engage in both domestic and international activities. Caritas Australia primarily operates as an international humanitarian and development actor abroad but also supports Indigenous Australians locally, while Caritas Japan focuses mainly on domestic operations while financially assisting relief efforts of other confederation members globally.

The size of Caritas organisations varies widely from small volunteer-run entities to some of the largest civil society organisations in their respective countries. For instance, American Catholic Relief Services (CRS) is one of the largest international humanitarian NGOs globally, reporting a revenue of US$923 million in 2020. Caritas Germany is the largest welfare organisation and private employer in Germany, with almost 700,000 employees. In the Democratic Republic of the Congo, Caritas Congo fills gaps in essential services where the State is absent and provides 41% of all education services.

Many Caritas organisations engaged in international cooperation and humanitarian relief outside their home countries operate as partnership organisations, practising localisation. This approach entails supporting local partners, typically local Caritas organisations, in implementing programs. Examples include Caritas Portugal, Development and Peace (Caritas Canada), and Caritas Denmark. Others, such as CRS, Caritas Czech Republic, and Caritas Switzerland, establish offices in third countries to directly manage humanitarian and development projects.

== Caritas national and regional agencies ==
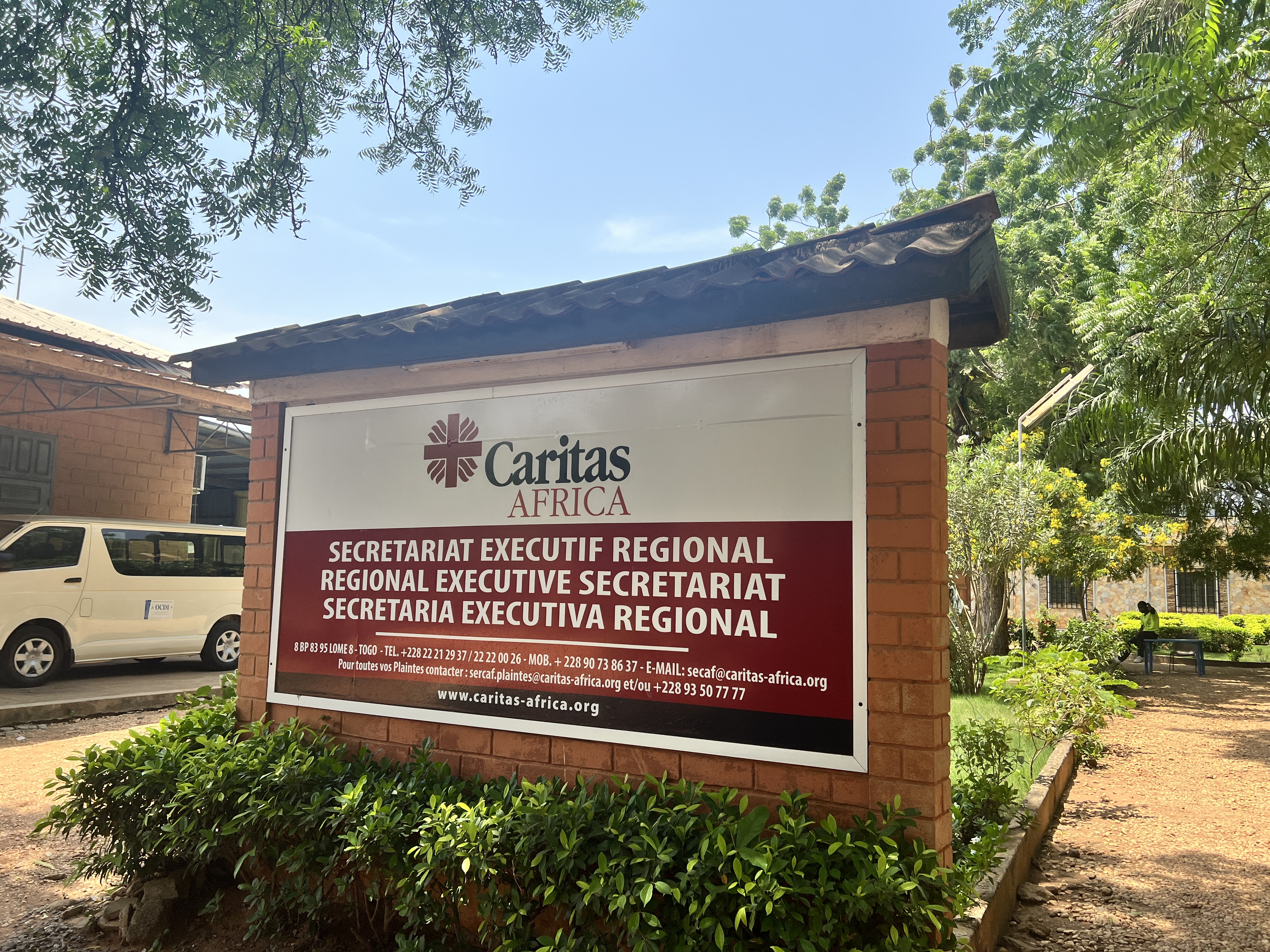
Sign in front of the office of the secretariat of Caritas Africa in Lomé, Togo

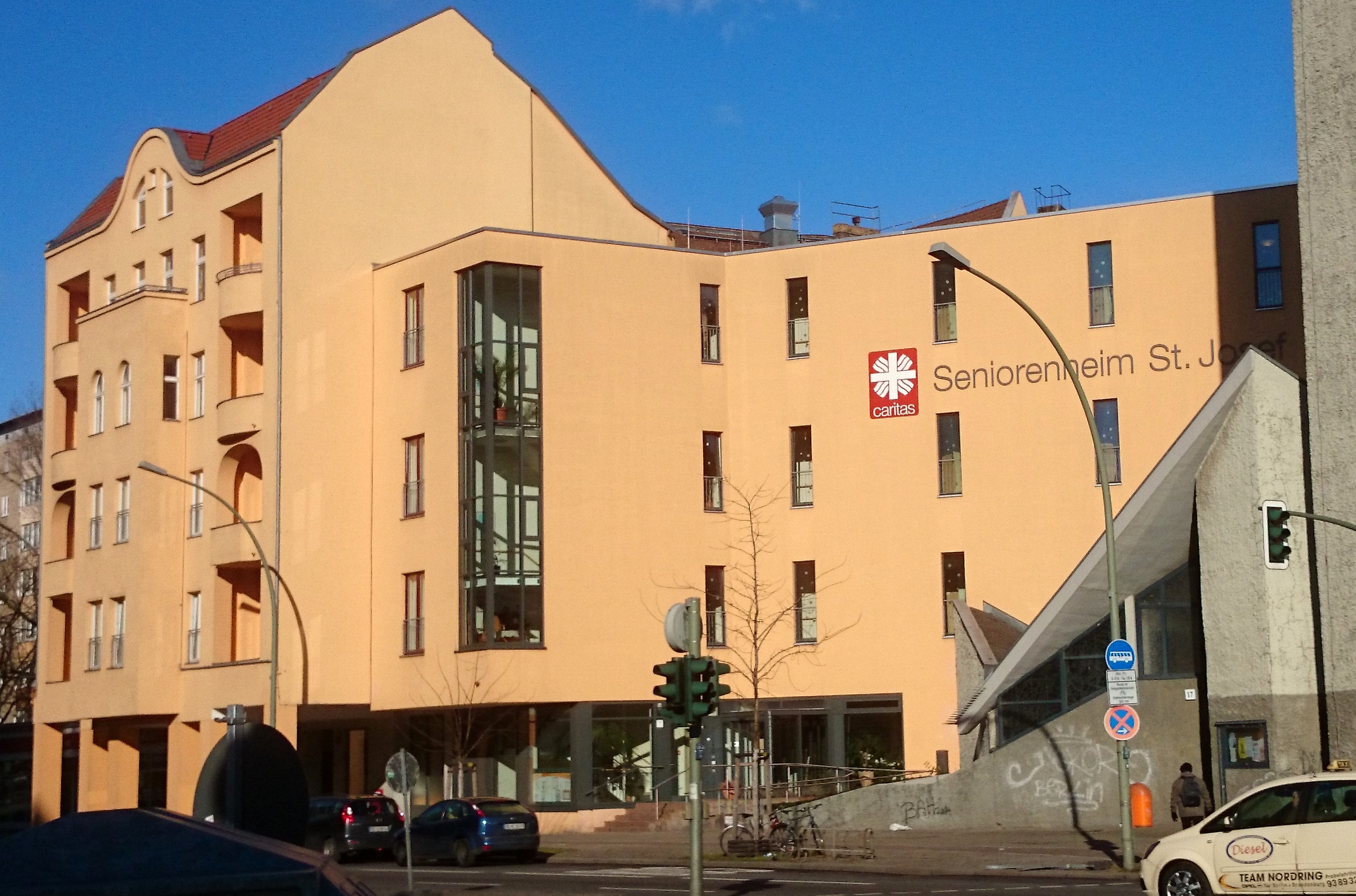
Nursery home of the German Caritas in Berlin

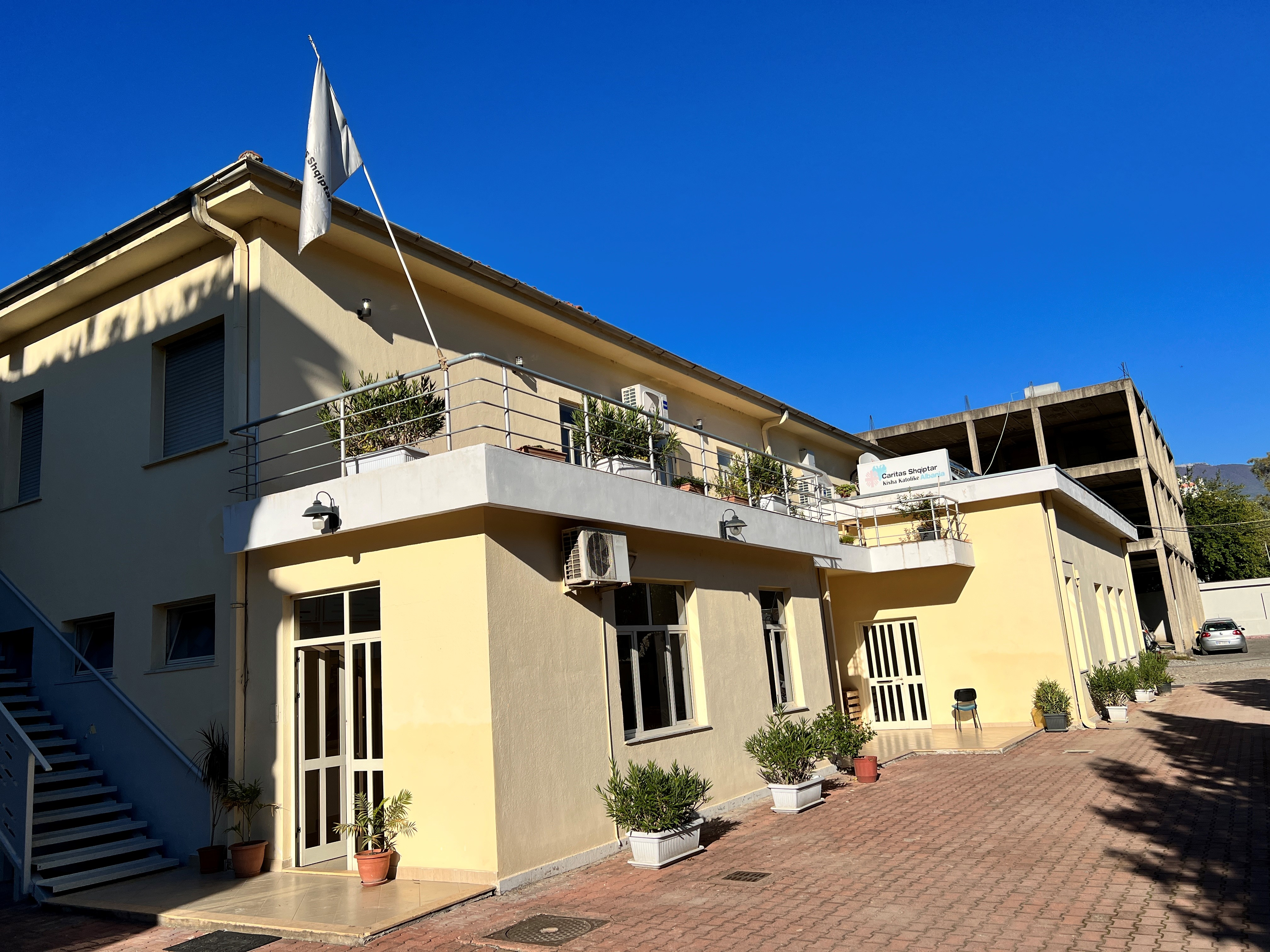
Main office of Caritas Albania in Tirana

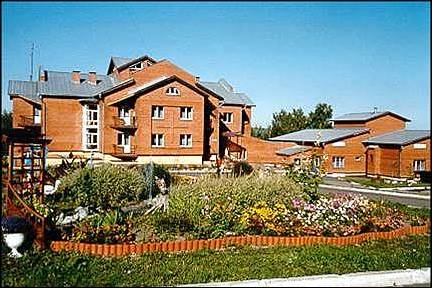
St. Nicholas Orphanage, established by Caritas in Novosibirsk, Russia

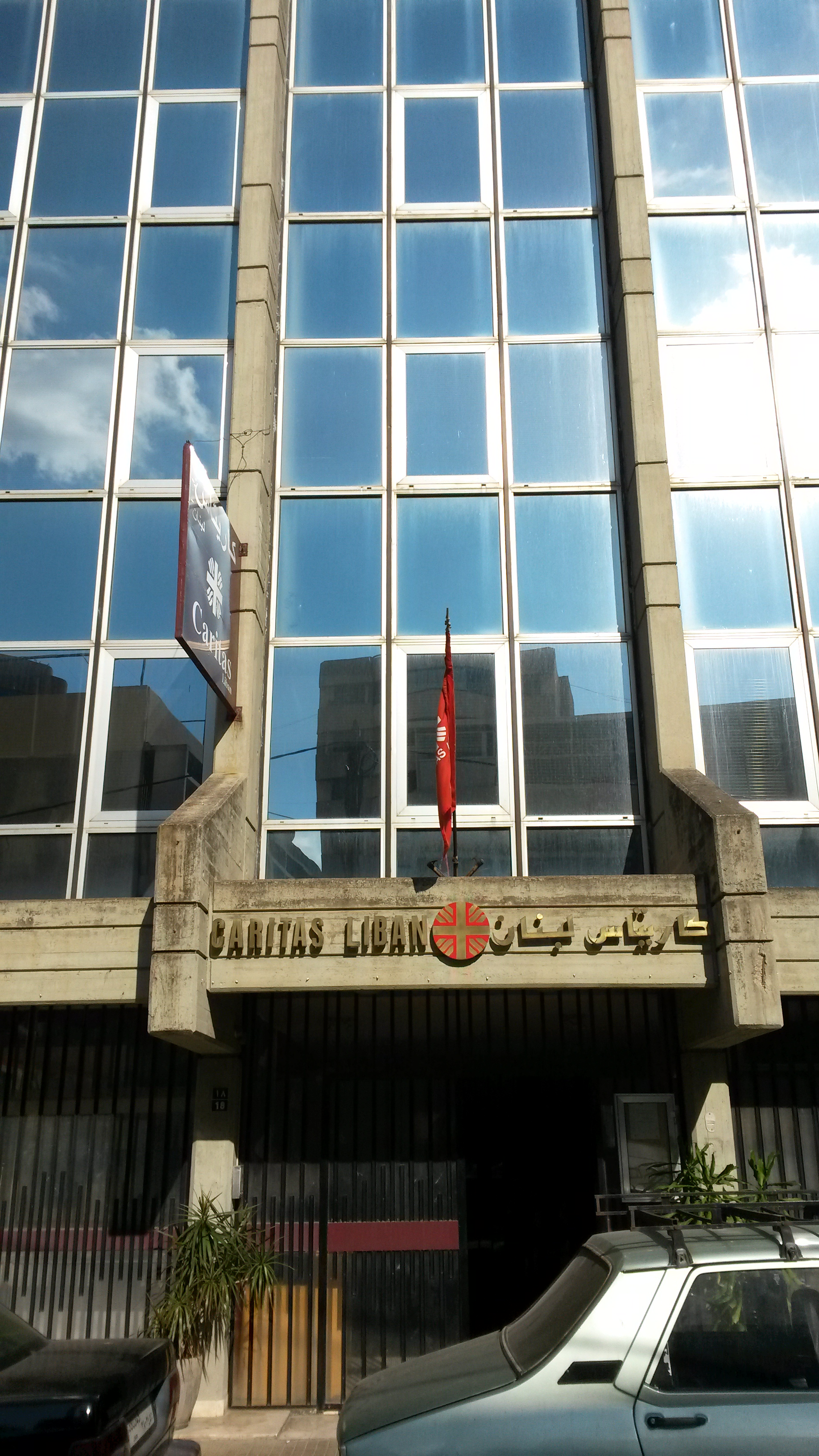
Headquarters of Caritas Lebanon in Beirut

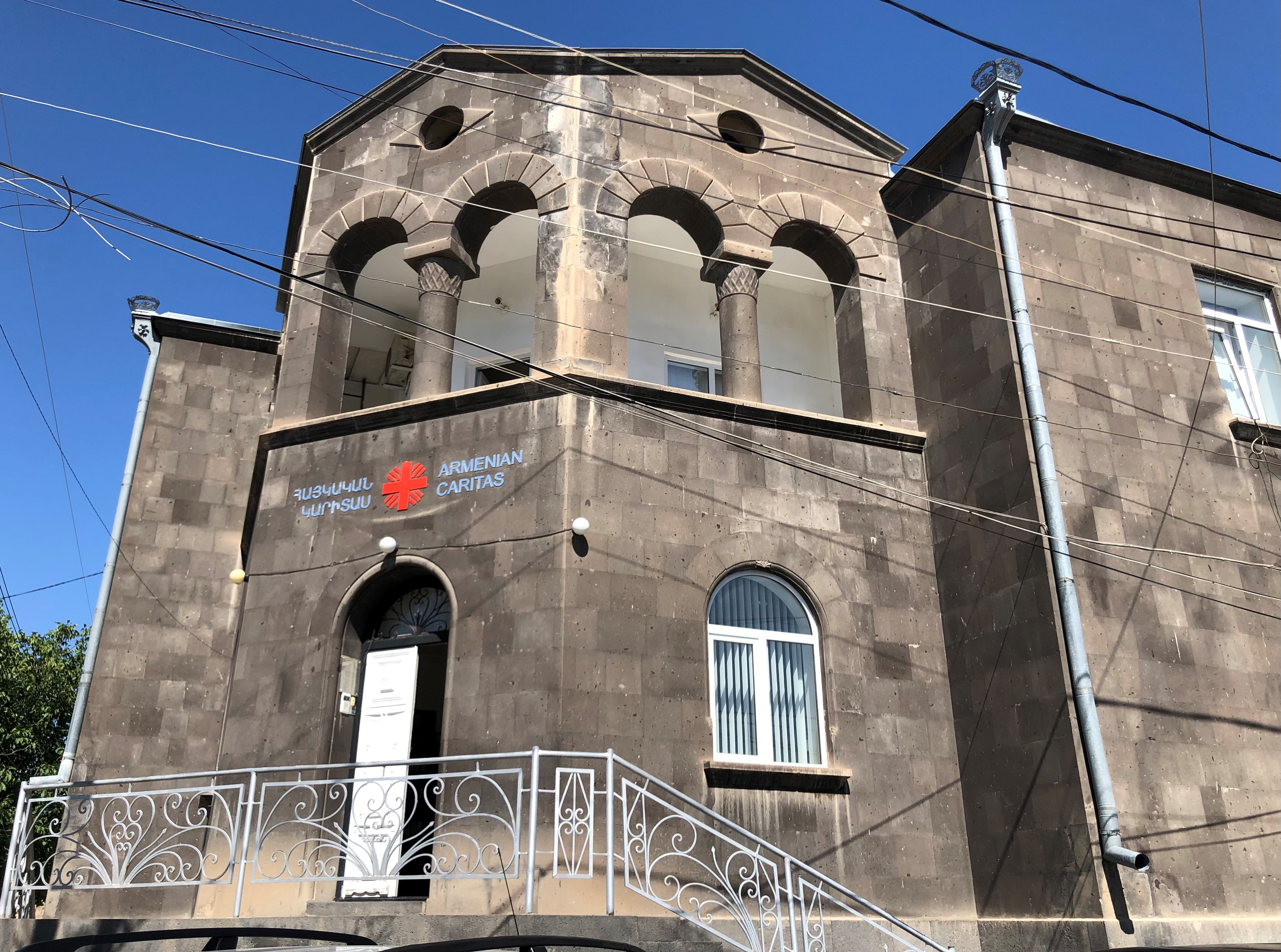
Headquarters of Armenian Caritas in Gyumri

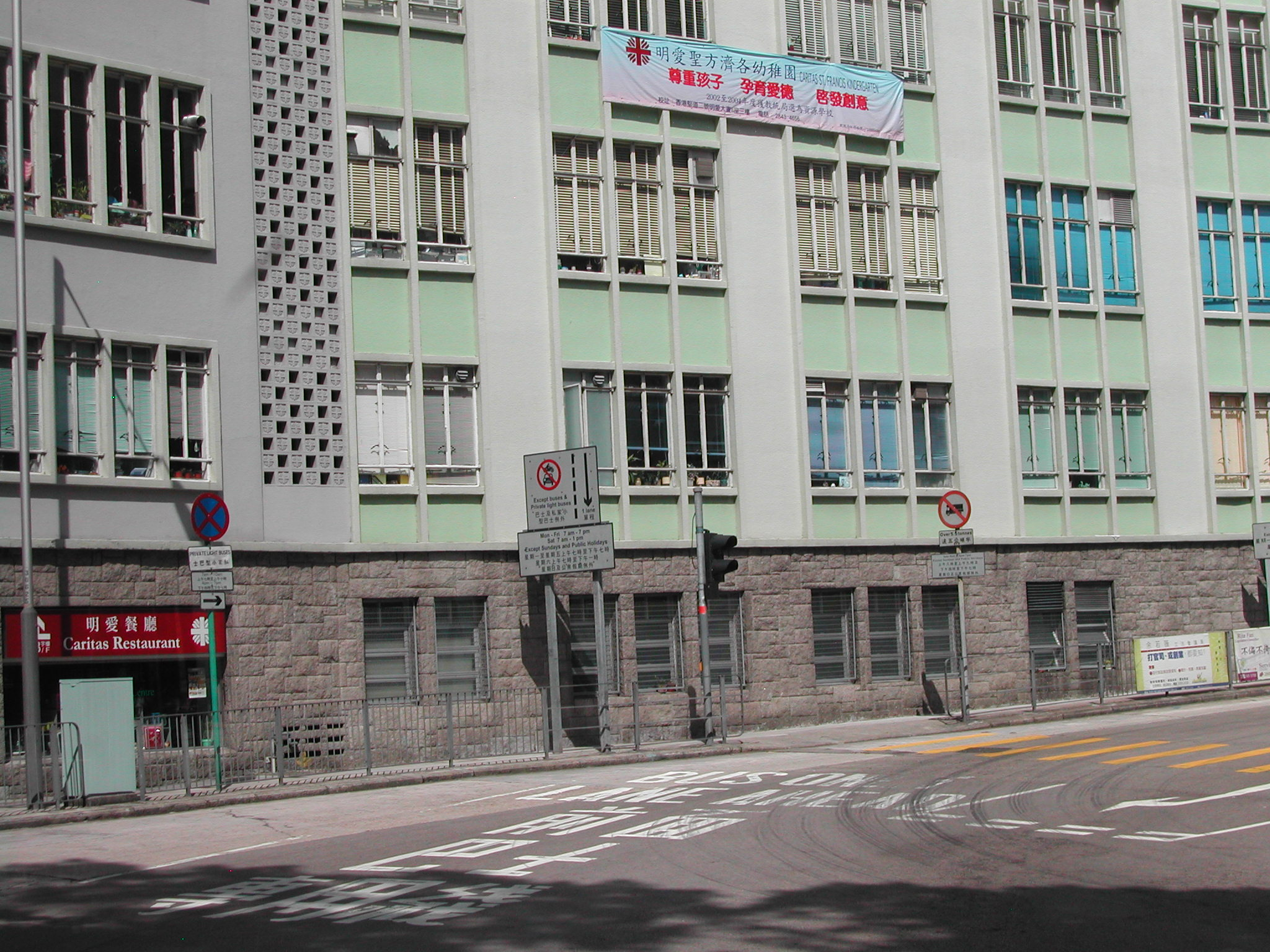
The Caritas House in Caine Road, Mid-levels, Hong Kong

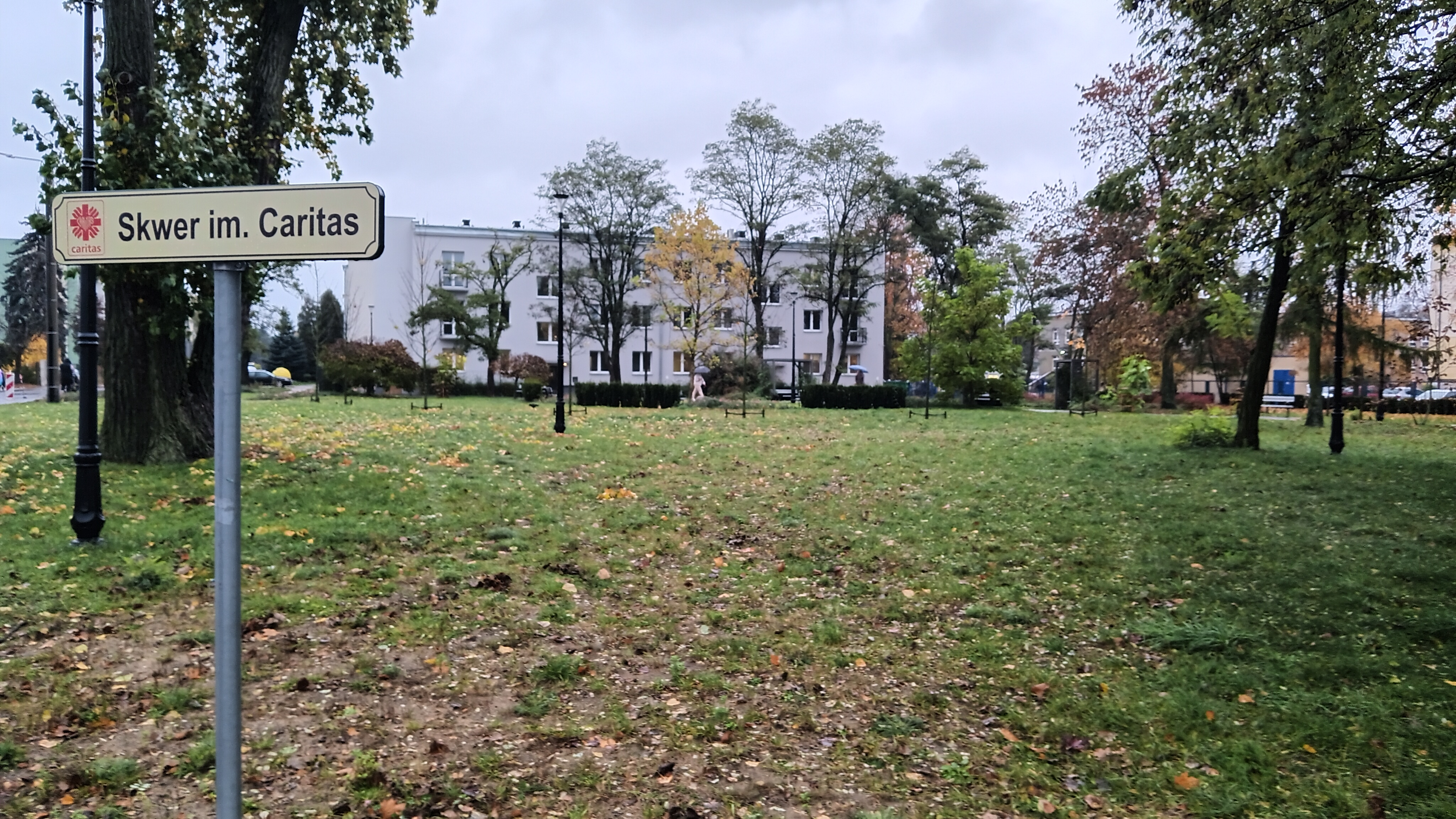
Caritas Garden Square at the General Hospital in Tomaszów Mazowiecki, Poland (2025)

The full membership list of Caritas organisations includes:

Region	Country	Member organisation (English name)	Established
Caritas Africa	Angola	Caritas Angola	1957
Caritas Africa	Benin	Caritas Benin	1958
Caritas Africa	Botswana	Caritas Botswana	1984
Caritas Africa	Burkina Faso	Caritas Burkina Faso (OCADES)	1956
Caritas Africa	Burundi	Caritas Burundi	1962
Caritas Africa	Cameroon	Caritas Cameroon	1971
Caritas Africa	Cape Verde	Caritas Cape Verde	1976
Caritas Africa	Central African Republic	Caritas Central African Republic	1960
Caritas Africa	Chad	Caritas Chad	1986
Caritas Africa	Comoros	Caritas Comoros	1979
Caritas Africa	Republic of the Congo	Caritas Congo Brazzaville	?
Caritas Africa	Democratic Republic of the Congo	Caritas Congo	1960
Caritas Africa	Ivory Coast	Caritas Côte d'Ivoire	1955
Caritas Africa	Equatorial Guinea	Caritas Equatorial Guinea	1980
Caritas Africa	Eritrea	Caritas Eritrea	?
Caritas Africa	Ethiopia	Caritas Ethiopia (ECC SDCO)	1965
Caritas Africa	Gabon	Caritas Gabon	1967
Caritas Africa	Gambia	Caritas Gambia (CaDO)	2001
Caritas Africa	Ghana	Caritas Ghana	1960
Caritas Africa	Guinea	Caritas Guinea (OCPH)	1986
Caritas Africa	Guinea-Bissau	Caritas Guinea-Bissau	1982
Caritas Africa	Kenya	Caritas Kenya	1973
Caritas Africa	Lesotho	Caritas Lesotho	1970
Caritas Africa	Liberia	Caritas Liberia	1990
Caritas Africa	Madagascar	Caritas Madagascar	1959
Caritas Africa	Malawi	Caritas Malawi (CADECOM)	1985
Caritas Africa	Mali	Caritas Mali	1986
Caritas Africa	Mauritius	Caritas Mauritius	1965
Caritas Africa	Mozambique	Caritas Mozambique	1977
Caritas Africa	Namibia	Caritas Namibia	1987
Caritas Africa	Niger	Caritas Niger (CADEV)	1962
Caritas Africa	Nigeria	Caritas Nigeria (CCFN)	2010
Caritas Africa	Rwanda	Caritas Rwanda	1960
Caritas Africa	São Tomé and Príncipe	Caritas São Tomé and Príncip	1981
Caritas Africa	Senegal	Caritas Senegal	1966
Caritas Africa	Seychelles	Caritas Seychelles	1975
Caritas Africa	Sierra Leone	Caritas Sierra Leone	1981
Caritas Africa	South Africa	Caritas South Africa (Siyabhabha Trust)	1970
Caritas Africa	South Sudan	Caritas South Sudan	2011
Caritas Africa	Sudan	Caritas Sudan	1972
Caritas Africa	Tanzania	Caritas Tanzania	1971
Caritas Africa	Togo	Caritas Togo (OCDI)	1967
Caritas Africa	Uganda	Caritas Uganda	1970
Caritas Africa	Zambia	Caritas Zambia	2001
Caritas Africa	Zimbabwe	Caritas Zimbabwe (CADEC) (Note: Caritas Gokwe operates in Zimbabwe's Gokwe region.)	1972
Caritas Africa	Eswatini	Caritas Swaziland	1977
Caritas Asia	Bangladesh	Caritas Bangladesh	1967
Caritas Asia	Brunei	Caritas Malaysia	?
Caritas Asia	Cambodia	Caritas Cambodia	1972
Caritas Asia	China	Caritas China	?
Caritas Asia	Hong Kong	Caritas Hong Kong	1953
Caritas Asia	India	Caritas India	1962
Caritas Asia	Indonesia	Caritas Indonesia (Karina KWI)	2006
Caritas Asia	Japan	Caritas Japan	1946
Caritas Asia	Kazakhstan	Caritas Kazakhstan	1997
Caritas Asia	Kyrgyzstan	Caritas Kyrgyzstan	2011
Caritas Asia	Laos	Caritas Laos	?
Caritas Asia	Macau	Caritas Macau	1951
Caritas Asia	Malaysia	Caritas Malaysia	2020
Caritas Asia	Mongolia	Caritas Mongolia	2000
Caritas Asia	Myanmar	Caritas Myanmar (KMSS)	2001
Caritas Asia	Nepal	Caritas Nepal	1990
Caritas Asia	Pakistan	Caritas Pakistan	1965
Caritas Asia	Philippines	Caritas Philippines (NASSA)	1966
Caritas Asia	Singapore	Caritas Singapore	2006
Caritas Asia	Singapore	CHARIS	2010
Caritas Asia	South Korea	Caritas Korea	1975
Caritas Asia	Sri Lanka	Caritas Sri Lanka	1968
Caritas Asia	Taiwan	Caritas Taiwan	1969
Caritas Asia	Tajikistan	Caritas Tajikistan	2007
Caritas Asia	Thailand	Caritas Thailand	1972
Caritas Asia	Timor-Leste	Caritas Timor Leste	1999
Caritas Asia	Turkmenistan	Caritas Turkmenistan	?
Caritas Asia	Uzbekistan	Caritas Uzbekistan	2002
Caritas Asia	Vietnam	Caritas Vietnam	1965
Caritas Europa	Albania	Caritas Albania	1993
Caritas Europa	Andorra	Caritas Andorra	1993
Caritas Europa	Armenia	Armenian Caritas	1995
Caritas Europa	Austria	Caritas Austria	1897
Caritas Europa	Azerbaijan	Caritas Azerbaijan	?
Caritas Europa	Belarus	Caritas Belarus	1990
Caritas Europa	Belgium	Caritas in Belgium	1949
Caritas Europa	Bosnia and Herzegovina	Caritas Bosnia and Herzegovina	1995
Caritas Europa	Bulgaria	Caritas Bulgaria	1993
Caritas Europa	Croatia	Caritas Croatia	1992
Caritas Europa	Czech Republic	Caritas Czech Republic	1928
Caritas Europa	Denmark	Caritas Denmark	1947
Caritas Europa	Estonia	Caritas Estonia	1997
Caritas Europa	Finland	Caritas Finland	1960
Caritas Europa	France	Caritas France (Secours catholique)	1946
Caritas Europa	Georgia	Caritas Georgia	1994
Caritas Europa	Germany	Caritas Germany	1897
Caritas Europa	Greece	Caritas Hellas	1976
Caritas Europa	Hungary	Caritas Hungary	1931
Caritas Europa	Iceland	Caritas Iceland	1989
Caritas Europa	Ireland	Trócaire	1973
Caritas Europa	Italy	Caritas Italy	1971
Caritas Europa	Kosovo	Caritas Kosovo	1992
Caritas Europa	Latvia	Caritas Latvia	2004
Caritas Europa	Lithuania	Caritas Lithuania	1926
Caritas Europa	Luxembourg	Caritas Luxembourg	1932
Caritas Europa	North Macedonia	Macedonian Caritas	1993
Caritas Europa	Malta	Caritas Malta	1965
Caritas Europa	Moldova	Caritas Moldova	1995
Caritas Europa	Monaco	Caritas Monaco	1990
Caritas Europa	Montenegro	Caritas Montenegro	1979
Caritas Europa	Netherlands	Cordaid	2000
Caritas Europa	Norway	Caritas Norway	1952
Caritas Europa	Poland	Caritas Poland	1990
Caritas Europa	Portugal	Caritas Portugal	1956
Caritas Europa	Romania	Caritas Romania	1994
Caritas Europa	Russia	Caritas Russia	1991
Caritas Europa	Serbia	Caritas Serbia	1995
Caritas Europa	Slovakia	Caritas Slovakia	1927
Caritas Europa	Slovenia	Caritas Slovenia	1995
Caritas Europa	Spain	Caritas Spain	1947
Caritas Europa	Sweden	Caritas Sweden	1946
Caritas Europa	Switzerland	Caritas Switzerland	1901
Caritas Europa	Turkey	Caritas Turkey	1951
Caritas Europa	Ukraine	Caritas Ukraine	1992
Caritas Europa	Ukraine	Caritas-Spes Ukraine	1991
Caritas Europa	United Kingdom	CAFOD (Note: CAFOD is an England and Wales organisation which focuses on international development)	1960
Caritas Europa	United Kingdom	Caritas Social Action Network (CSAN) (Note: CSAN focusses on domestic social issues in England and Wales)	2003
Caritas Europa	United Kingdom (Scotland)	SCIAF	1965
Caritas Latin America and Caribbean	Antilles	Caritas Antilles	?
Caritas Latin America and Caribbean	Argentina	Caritas Argentina	1956
Caritas Latin America and Caribbean	Bolivia	Caritas Bolivia	1958
Caritas Latin America and Caribbean	Brazil	Caritas Brazil	1956
Caritas Latin America and Caribbean	Chile	Caritas Chile	1956
Caritas Latin America and Caribbean	Colombia	Caritas Colombia	1956
Caritas Latin America and Caribbean	Costa Rica	Caritas Costa Rica	1963
Caritas Latin America and Caribbean	Cuba	Caritas Cuba	1991
Caritas Latin America and Caribbean	Dominican Republic	Caritas Dominican Republic	1961
Caritas Latin America and Caribbean	Ecuador	Caritas Ecuador	1961
Caritas Latin America and Caribbean	El Salvador	Caritas El Salvador	1960
Caritas Latin America and Caribbean	Guatemala	Caritas Guatemala	1962
Caritas Latin America and Caribbean	Haiti	Caritas Haiti	1975
Caritas Latin America and Caribbean	Honduras	Caritas Honduras	1959
Caritas Latin America and Caribbean	Mexico	Caritas Mexico	1973
Caritas Latin America and Caribbean	Nicaragua	Caritas Nicaragua	1960
Caritas Latin America and Caribbean	Panama	Caritas Panama	1970
Caritas Latin America and Caribbean	Peru	Caritas Peru	1955
Caritas Latin America and Caribbean	Paraguay	Caritas Paraguay	1958
Caritas Latin America and Caribbean	Puerto Rico	Caritas Puerto Rico	1969
Caritas Latin America and Caribbean	Uruguay	Caritas Uruguay	1962
Caritas Latin America and Caribbean	Venezuela	Caritas Venezuela	1963
Caritas MONA	Algeria	Caritas Algeria	1962
Caritas MONA	Cyprus	Caritas Cyprus	1974
Caritas MONA	Djibouti	Caritas Djibouti	1978
Caritas MONA	Egypt	Caritas Egypt	1967
Caritas MONA	Iraq	Caritas Iraq	1981
Caritas MONA	Iran	Caritas Iran	1992
Caritas MONA	Holy Land	Caritas Jerusalem	1967
Caritas MONA	Jordan	Caritas Jordan	1967
Caritas MONA	Lebanon	Caritas Lebanon	1976
Caritas MONA	Libya	Caritas Libya	?
Caritas MONA	Mauritania	Caritas Mauritania	1972
Caritas MONA	Morocco	Caritas Morocco	1947
Caritas MONA	Somalia	Caritas Somalia	1980
Caritas MONA	Syria	Caritas Syria	1954
Caritas MONA	Tunisia	Caritas Tunisia	?
Caritas Oceania	Australia	Caritas Australia	1964
Caritas Oceania	Fiji	Caritas Fiji	2019
Caritas Oceania	Papua New Guinea	Caritas Papua New Guinea	1974
Caritas Oceania	New Zealand	Caritas Aotearoa New Zealand	1966
Caritas Oceania	Samoa	Caritas Samoa	2008
Caritas Oceania	Tonga	Caritas Tonga	1972
Caritas Oceania	Pacific Islands	Caritas Pacific Islands	1980
Caritas North America	Canada	Development and Peace	1967
Caritas North America	United States	Catholic Charities	1910
Caritas North America	United States	Catholic Relief Services	1943

== Governance ==
=== Presidents ===
The successive presidents of Caritas Internationalis have been:

- 1951–1962: Bishop Ferdinando Baldelli
- 1962–1965: Cardinal Raúl Silva Henríquez
- 1965–1972: Msgr. Jean Rodhain
- 1972–1974: Msgr. Carl Vath
- 1974–1975: Archbishop Aloísio Lorscheider
- 1975–1983: Msgr. Georg Hüssler
- 1983–1991: Cardinal Alexandre do Nascimento
- 1991–1999: Bishop Affonso Felippe Gregory
- 1999–2005: Archbishop Youhanna Fouad El-Hage
- 2005–2007: Mr. Denis Viénot
- 2007–2015: Cardinal Óscar Andrés Rodríguez Maradiaga
- 2015–2022: Cardinal Luis Antonio Tagle
- 2023–present: Archbishop Tarcisio Isao Kikuchi

=== Secretaries-general ===
The secretaries-general of Caritas Internationalis have been:

- 1951–1970: Msgr. Carlo Bayer
- 1970–1971: Mr. G. Flour
- 1971–1972: Rev. Robert Riendeau
- 1972–1983: Mr. Emilio Fracchia
- 1983–1995: Mr. Gerhard Meier
- 1995–1999: Mr. Luc Trouillard
- 1999–2007: Mr. Duncan MacLaren
- 2007–2011: Ms. Lesley-Anne Knight
- 2011–2019: Mr. Michel Roy
- 2019–2022: Mr. Aloysius John
- 2022–2023: Mr. Pier Francesco Pinelli (Temporary Administrator)
- 2023–present: Mr. Alistair Dutton

== See also ==
- Catholic Relief Services
- Catholic social teaching
- Christian humanitarian aid
- Church asylum
- Fidesco International

== Literature ==
- Moved With Compassion - The History of Caritas Europa - Festschrift on the Occasion of the 25th Anniversary of Caritas Europa's Statutes 1993–2018. Jorge Nuño Mayer. 2018. ISBN 978-972-9008-55-9.
- Matthias Schmidhalter (May 2007). The History of Caritas Internationalis. Vatican: Caritas Internationalis.
- Witness and Solidarity: 70 Years of Caritas Internationalis. Vatican City: General Secretariat of Caritas Internationalis. 2022. ISBN 979-12-210-0838-8.
- Viénot, Denis (2010). La justice dans la peau - Géopolitique de l'action humanitaire (PDF) (in French). Paris: Éditions Desclée de Brouwer. ISBN 978-2-220-06195-5.
