= Caritas Mexico =

Mexican Catholic charity organisation

- Cáritas Mexicana
- Established: 15 June 1973
- Type: Nonprofit
- Legal status: IAP
- Purpose: development aid, humanitarian aid, social services
- Location: Mexico City, Mexico
- Coordinates: 19.38357°N 99.18208°W
- Origins: Catholic Social Teaching
- Region served: Mexico
- Affiliations: Caritas Internationalis, Caritas Latin America and Caribbean
- Website: www.caritasmexicana.org

Caritas Mexico (Spanish: Cáritas Mexicana) is a Mexican nonprofit organisation. It is the official aid organisation of the Catholic Church in Mexico.

The organisation is a member of the global Caritas Internationalis confederation and of Caritas Latin America and Caribbean.

== Background ==
In 1971 Pope Paul VI established the Pontifical Council Cor Unum. Its goal was the coordination, promotion and intensification of Catholic relief and assistance activities and organizations. One of the two members of the council was Adalberto Almeida y Merino, Archbishop of Chihuahua. He returned home to convince the Episcopal Conference of Mexico to create a national Caritas in Mexico, which was achieved in 1973.

The original purpose of Caritas Mexico was to serve as the federation of the Mexican diocesan Caritas organisations, as most Catholic dioceses had established their own Caritas. However, between 1979 and 1995, Caritas Mexico mainly provided emergency relief and social assistance. In 1997, its legal status changed and it became an Institución de Asistencia Privada (Private Assistance Institution). This allowed it to restore its original purpose as a federation. In 2024, there were 62 diocesan Caritas branches operating in 30 Mexican states.

== Structure ==
Caritas Mexico consists of dozens of regional, independent Caritas organisations in Mexico, one in each of the Catholic dioceses of Mexico. They implement social projects locally.

The diocesan organisations are:

- Cáritas Mexicana IAP
- Cáritas Aguascalientes AC
- Cáritas Arquidiócesis de México IAP
- Cáritas de Monterrey ABP
- Cáritas de Querétaro IAP
- Cáritas de Guadalajara AC
- Cáritas Lomita IAP (Culiacán)
- Caritas Mazatlán IAP
- Cáritas de Baja California Sur AC (La Paz)
- Cáritas Diocesana Morelia IAP
- Cáritas de Chihuahua IBP
- Centro de Estudios y Promoción Social Cáritas AC (San Luís Potosí)
- Cáritas de Tabasco AC
- Cáritas de Quintana Roo AC
- Caritas de Yucatán AC
- Cáritas de San Juan de los Lagos AC
- Cáritas de León AC
- Cáritas de San Cristobal de las Casas AC
- Cáritas de la Arquidiócesis de Acapulco AC
- Cáritas de Saltillo AC
- Fundación de Beneficencia Privada Cáritas de Puebla IBP
- Cáritas de Nuevo Laredo AC
- Cáritas Colima IAP
- Cáritas Diocesano de Piedras Negras AC
- Cáritas Hidalgo AC (Tula)
- Cáritas Tulancingo AC
- Cáritas de Huajuapan de León AC
- Cáritas de la Diócesis de Ecatepec IAP
- Cáritas de la Diócesis de Tenancingo IAP
- Cáritas de Tampico AC
- Cáritas de la Arquidiócesis de Tlalnepantla IAP
- Cáritas Parral AC
- Cáritas Diocesanas de Torreón AC
- Cáritas de Ciudad Victoria AC
- Cáritas Xalapa
- Cáritas Tehuacán AC
- Cáritas de Cordoba AC
- Cáritas Diócesis de San Andrés Tuxtla AC
- Cáritas de la Sagrada Familia de Gomez Palacio Durango AC
- Caridad Pastoral Social AC (Matamoros)
- Cáritas Región Mexicali AC
- Cáritas Region Siderurgica A.C.
- Caritas de Zamora AC
- Cáritas Morelos AC
- Cáritas de Tuxpan AC
- Cáritas de Tuxtla Gutiérrez AC
- Caritas Región Noroeste AC (Tijuana)
- Cáritas Veracruz
- Cáritas Zacatecas
- Cáritas Kórima IASP (Tarahumara)
- Cáritas Toluca
- Cáritas Texcoco
- Centro asistencial y de promoción humana AC (Celaya)
- Cáritas Diócesis de Irapuato AC
- Cáritas diocesana de Antequera Oaxaca
- Cáritas de Autlán AC
- Cáritas Diocesana de Coatzacoalcos
- Cáritas Nezahualcóyotl
- Cáritas Hermosillo
- Cáritas de CD Juárez
- Cáritas Campeche
- Cáritas Tlaxcala
- Cáritas Nuevo Casas Grandes
- Cáritas Tepic
- Cáritas de San Agustín Tapachula
- Cáritas Tlapa
- Cáritas Teotihuacán
- Cáritas Tehuantepec
- Cáritas de Apatzingán
- Cáritas Lázaro Cárdenas
- Cáritas CD Valles
- Cáritas CD Altamirano
- Cáritas del Guadiana
- Cáritas Huejutla
