= Caritas Asia =

Asian Catholic charity confederation

- Established: 1999
- Type: Nonprofit
- Location: Bangkok, Thailand
- Coordinates: 13.78297°N 100.54619°E
- Origins: Catholic Social Teaching
- Region served: Asia
- Fields: Development aid, Humanitarian aid, Social services
- President: Benedict Alo D'Rozario
- Parent organization: Caritas Internationalis
- Website: caritas.asia

Caritas Asia is a pan-Asian nonprofit organisation and one of the seven regions of the global Caritas Internationalis confederation. Caritas Asia refers both to its regional secretariat, based in Bangkok and its network with 25 member organisations.

== Background ==
Caritas Asia's predecessor was the Asia Partnership for Human Development, founded in 1973 and bringing together more than 23 Catholic development organisations from Asia and the West.

The current structure was established in 1999 during the general assembly of Caritas Internationalis in Rome, where the request of its Asian member organisation to create a regional secretariat was approved. The goal of Caritas Asia is to coordinate the work of its member organisations, especially in the context of responses to natural disaster, as well as to strengthen the technical capacities of the network.

== Membership ==
Caritas Asia consists of 25 national member organisations operating in 24 Asian countries. In Singapore, there are two member organisations: Caritas Singapore and Caritas Humanitarian Aid & Relief Initiatives (CHARIS). Not all Asian national Caritas organisations are members of Caritas Asia; those in the Middle East, despite being geographically located in Asia, such as Caritas Jordan, Caritas Iraq and Caritas Iran, are members of Caritas Middle East and North Africa, while Caritas of Armenia, Georgia, Russia and Turkey are part of Caritas Europa.

The membership of Caritas Asia is further grouped under four subregions, each having their own sub-regional office. These are Central Asia with an office in Kyrgyzstan, East Asia with an office in Macau, South Asia with an office in Sri Lanka and South-East Asia with an office in Singapore.

=== List of Member Organisations ===
Sub-region	Country	Member organisation (English name)	Established
South Asia	Bangladesh	Caritas Bangladesh	1967
South East Asia	Cambodia	Caritas Cambodia	1972
East Asia	Hong Kong	Caritas Hong Kong	1953
South Asia	India	Caritas India	1962
South East Asia	Indonesia	Caritas Indonesia (Karina KWI)	2006
East Asia	Japan	Caritas Japan	1946
Central Asia	Kazakhstan	Caritas Kazakhstan	1997
Central Asia	Kyrgyzstan	Caritas Kyrgyzstan	2011
South East Asia	Laos	Caritas Laos	?
East Asia	Macau	Caritas Macau	1951
South East Asia	Malaysia	Caritas Malaysia	2020
Central Asia	Mongolia	Caritas Mongolia	2000
South East Asia	Myanmar	Caritas Myanmar (KMSS)	2001
South Asia	Nepal	Caritas Nepal	1990
South Asia	Pakistan	Caritas Pakistan	1965
South East Asia	Philippines	Caritas Philippines (NASSA)	1966
South East Asia	Singapore	Caritas Singapore	2006
South East Asia	Singapore	CHARIS	2010
East Asia	South Korea	Caritas Korea	1975
South Asia	Sri Lanka	Caritas Sri Lanka	1968
East Asia	Taiwan	Caritas Taiwan	1969
Central Asia	Tajikistan	Caritas Tajikistan	2007
South East Asia	Thailand	Caritas Thailand	1972
South East Asia	Timor-Leste	Caritas Timor Leste	1999
Central Asia	Uzbekistan	Caritas Uzbekistan	2002
South East Asia	Vietnam	Caritas Vietnam	1965

== Leadership ==
=== Presidents ===
- ...
- 2007–2011: Joseph Vianney Fernando
- 2011–2019: Tarcisio Isao Kikuchi
- 2019–2023: Benedict Alo D'Rozario
- 2023–now: Tarcisio Isao Kikuchi

=== Regional Coordinators ===
- ...
- 2008–2012: Fr. Bonnie Mendes
- 2012–2023: Eleazar Gomez
- 2023–now: Shimray Mungreiphy
