= Caritas Czech Republic =

Catholic social welfare organization

- Charita Česká republika
- Established: 1928; 98 years ago
- Type: Nonprofit
- Legal status: national charitable foundation
- Headquarters: Vladislavova 1460/12
- Location: Prague, Czech Republic
- Coordinates: 50.08036°N 14.42136°E
- Origins: Catholic Social Teaching
- Region served: Czech Republic and worldwide
- Fields: social work, humanitarian aid
- Secretary General: Jakub Líčka
- Director: Lukáš Curyla
- President: Mons. Pavel Posád
- Main organ: board of directors
- Affiliations: Caritas Europa, Caritas Internationalis
- Revenue: CZK 6,618,052,000 (2022)
- Expenses: CZK 6,557,293,000 (2022)
- Volunteers: 69,240 (2022)
- Website: www.charita.cz

Caritas Czech Republic (Czech: Charita Česká republika) is a Czech Catholic not-for-profit social welfare and humanitarian relief organisation. It is a service of the Czech Bishops' Conference and is the largest social welfare and charitable organisation in the country. Caritas Czech Republic is a member of both Caritas Europa and Caritas Internationalis.

== History ==
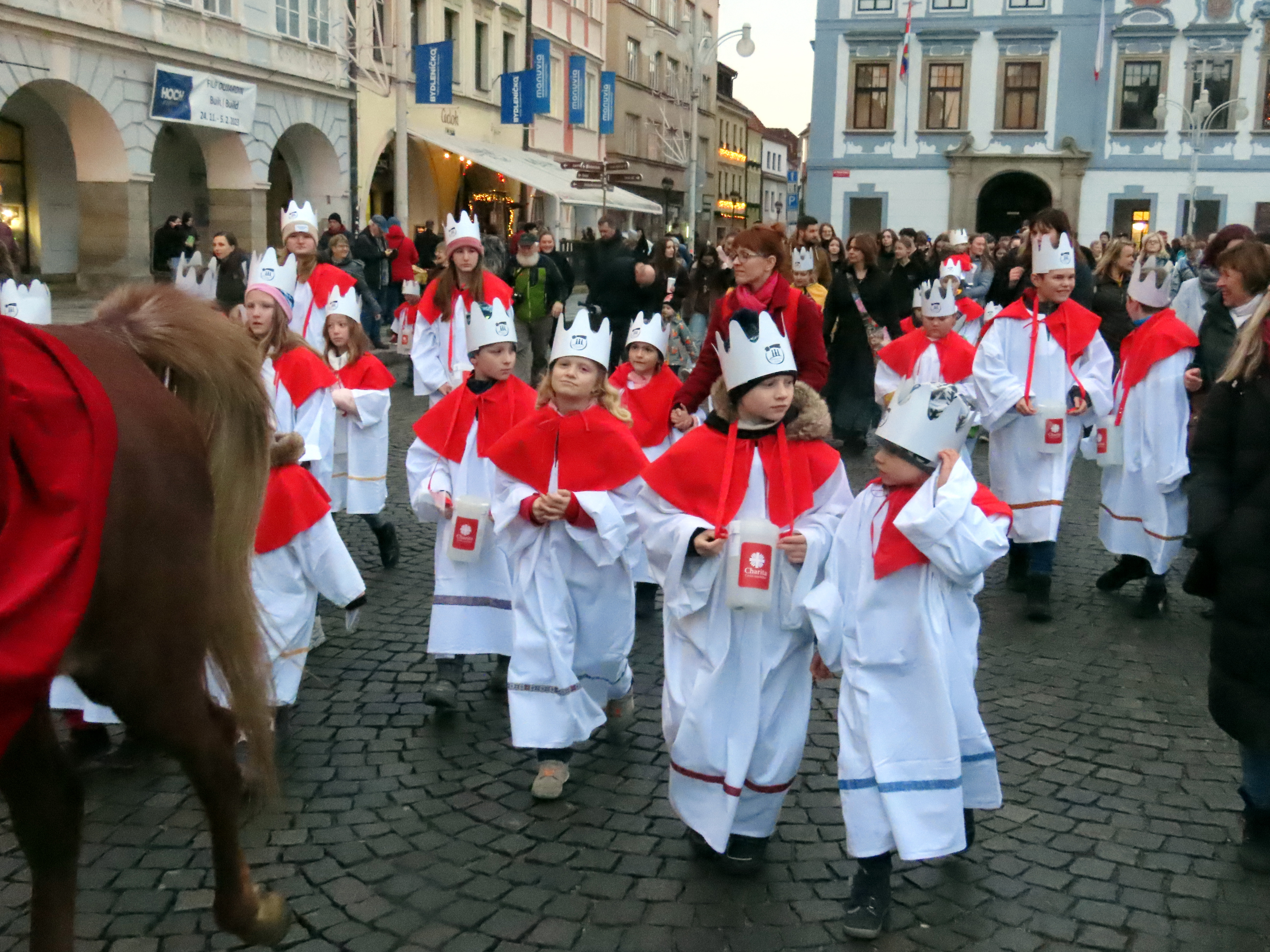
Children during Caritas' traditional three kings collection in České Budějovice in 2023.

The organisation today known as Caritas Czech Republic was founded after the end of the First World War and the collapse of the Austro-Hungarian Empire, when structured charity organisations separated from Caritas Austria and began to operate in various places. At the beginning of the First Czechoslovak Republic, proclaimed in 1918, a network of Catholic agencies gradually emerged, first at grassroots level. This led to the creation of a national Caritas office in Prague in 1928. The goal of this organisation was to coordinate these actions. The Czech Caritas network progressively developed over the following years.

In 1945, right at the end of World War II, before the authorities responded to the need for immediate assistance for returning concentration camp prisoners and other war victims, Caritas opened canteens, assisted in document matters, and cared for and treated people. During that time, Caritas nursing stations were staffed by certified and volunteer nurses.separated

After the 1948 communist coup d'état, Caritas, a Catholic organisation, was consciously expelled from its social and medical environment by the State. The entire Caritas network was dissolved and replaced by a single volunteer organisation, the Czech Catholic Caritas. It was under state supervision and its activities were limited to publishing religious press and literature, selling devotional items and caring for elderly monks, nuns and priests.

The rebuilding of the organisation only started after the Velvet Revolution of 1989. The leaders of many local Caritas organisations were parish members, often participants in pilgrimages to Rome for the canonization of Agnes of Bohemia, or members of Christian relief committees formed after the devastating 1988 Armenian earthquake. In 1995, Caritas Czech Republic became a full member of Caritas Internationalis and of Caritas Europa.

Two years later, Caritas Czech Republic played a significant role as a primary provider of disaster relief during the extensive flooding in Moravia. The organisation actively participated in the reconstruction efforts, providing assistance to affected individuals, coordinating fundraising campaigns, and engaging in various support activities for the community.

In 2001, Caritas launched its annual Three Kings collection (Tříkrálová sbírka) for the first time.

Other major events that the organisation responded to were the 2002 floods, the COVID-19 pandemic (starting in 2020), the 2021 South Moravia tornado, AND THE arrival of Ukrainian refugees starting in 2022.

== Structure ==
Caritas Czech Republic follows the structure of the Czech Catholic Church. The organisations consists of a national secretariat and 10 archdiocesan or diocesan Caritas organisations which are subdivided into 274 local structures. The secretariat based in Prague is responsible for the coordination of activities at the national level and is engaged in health and social advocacy activities. It also maintains a separate department for the implementation of humanitarian aid and development cooperation activities, and it operates a hotel and training centre, named Marianeum and located in Prague.

The diocesan Caritas structures coordinate the activities of Caritas organisations in the territory of the dioceses. They also provide some services but most of the social and health services of Caritas in Czech Republic are provided by the hundreds of regional, municipal and parish Caritas organisations.

The eight diocesan structures of Caritas Czech Republic are:

- Diocesan Caritas Brno
- Diocesan Caritas České Budějovice
- Diocesan Catholic Caritas Hradec Králové
- Diocesan Caritas Litoměřice
- Archdiocesan Caritas Olomouc
- Diocesan Caritas Ostrava-Opava
- Diocesan Caritas Plzeň
- Archdiocesan Caritas Prague

Another organisation that is part of Caritas Czech Republic, Czech Catholic Caritas (Česká katolická charita) operates 9 retirement homes for nuns and priests.

== Work ==
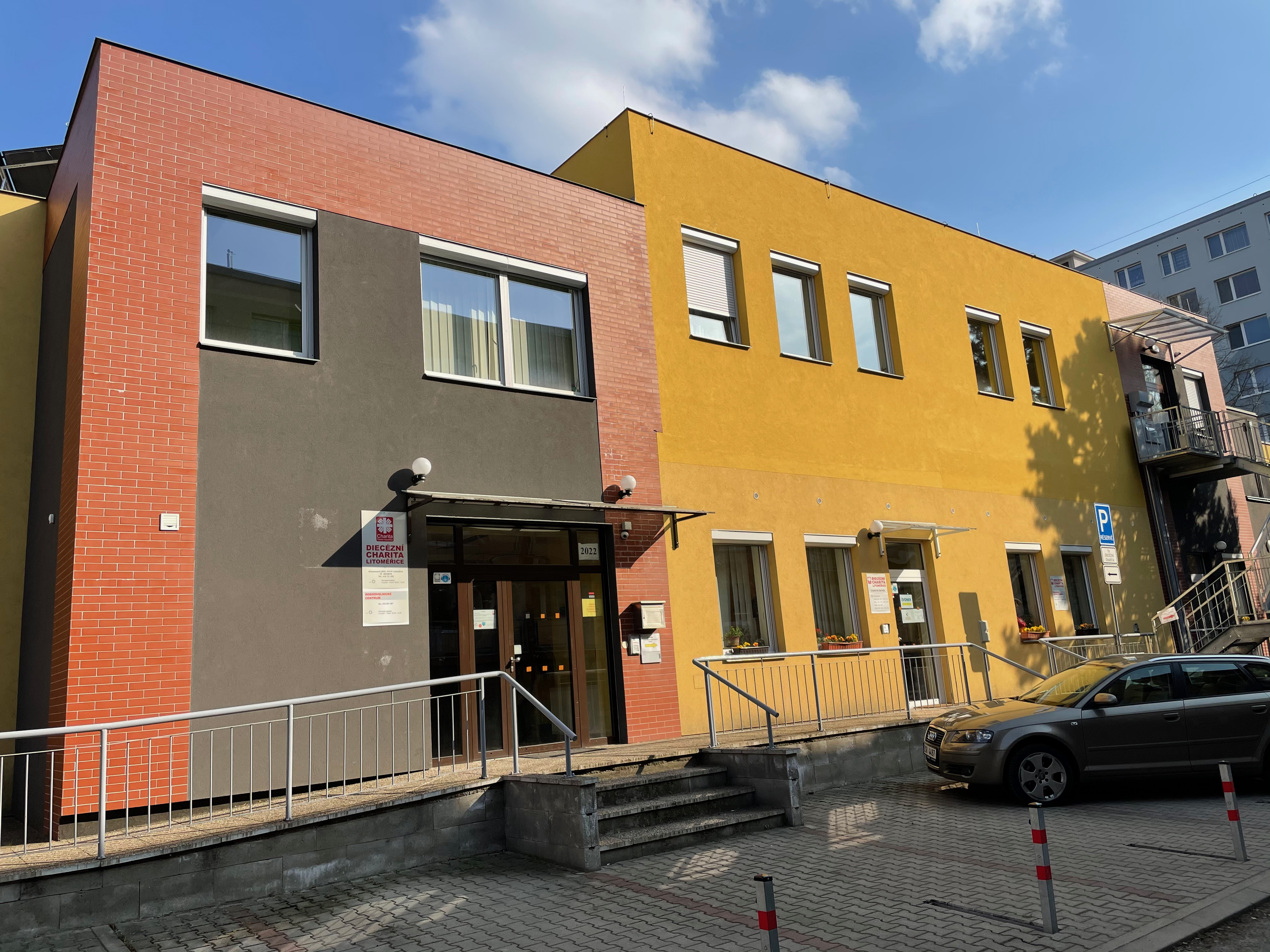
A house of the diocesan Caritas Litoměřice.

Caritas Czech Republic works in a variety of social sectors. In 2022, the organisation ran 72 specialised counselling centres and 178 registered healthcare facilities which employed 1,667 nurses. Its social and healthcare services, including counselling, social care, social prevention and healthcare, reached 199,504 individuals. In addition, more than 500 persons benefitted from afforable housing to more than 500 persons.

Additionally, Caritas Czech Republic managed 22 social enterprises in 2022, including cafés, sewing workshops, laundries, bakeries, pastry shops, waffle production, furniture renovation, and food preparation and delivery services.

Internationally, Caritas Czech Republic directly implements humanitarian and development projects though its country offices in Georgia, Iraq, Moldova, Mongolia, Turkey and Ukraine. The organisation is one of the NGO partners of DG ECHO.
