= Caritas Latin America and Caribbean =

Panamerican Catholic charity confederation

- Cáritas América Latina y el Caribe
- Abbreviation: Cáritas LAC
- Type: Nonprofit
- Location: San Jose, Costa Rica
- Origins: Catholic Social Teaching
- Region served: Latin America and the Caribbean
- Fields: development aid, humanitarian aid, social services
- Official language: Spanish
- President: Gustavo Rodríguez Vega
- Parent organization: Caritas Internationalis
- Website: caritaslatinoamerica.org

Caritas Latin America and Caribbean (Spanish: Cáritas América Latina y el Caribe; Portuguese: Cáritas América Latina e Caribe) is a network of Catholic nonprofit organisations active in Latin America and the Caribbean and one of the seven regions of the global Caritas Internationalis confederation.

Its name is used both for the regional secretariat and its network of 22 member organisations, but the secretariat is also known as Secretariado Latinoamericano y del Caribe de Caritas (SELACC).

== Work ==
The role of Caritas Latin America and Caribbean is to foster peer exchange and learning among its member organisations, and to speak with a unified voice. The secretariat (SELACC) is also engaged in advocacy, for example concerning the European Union, Latin America and the Caribbean Summits as well as in the institutional capacity strengthening of its member organisations.

== Membership and structure ==
Unlike other regions of Caritas Internationalis, such as Caritas Europa with its secretariat in Brussels, or Caritas Africa with its secretariat in Lomé, the secretariat of Caritas Latin America and Caribbean is decentralised, albeit legally registered in San José, Costa Rica. This means that the staff is located in the offices of its various member organisations across the continent.

The member organisations are the national Caritas organisations of Latin America. These are subdivided into regional subgroups: Camex for Central America, Caribe for the Caribbean island organisations, Bolivariana for north-eastern South America and Cono Sur for the Southern tip of the continent as well as for Brazil.

The country offices of other Caritas organisations, such as of the American Catholic Relief Services or of Caritas Switzerland, are not members of Caritas Latin America and Caribbean.

=== List of member organisations ===
Sub-region	Country	Member organisation (English name)	Established
Caribe	Antilles	Caritas Antilles	?
Cono Sur	Argentina	Caritas Argentina	1956
Bolivariana	Bolivia	Caritas Bolivia	1958
Cono Sur	Brazil	Caritas Brazil	1956
Cono Sur	Chile	Caritas Chile	1956
Bolivariana	Colombia	Caritas Colombia	1956
Camex	Costa Rica	Caritas Costa Rica	1963
Caribe	Cuba	Caritas Cuba	1991
Caribe	Dominican Republic	Caritas Dominican Republic	1961
Bolivariana	Ecuador	Caritas Ecuador	1961
Camex	El Salvador	Caritas El Salvador	1960
Camex	Guatemala	Caritas Guatemala	1962
Caribe	Haiti	Haiti	1975
Camex	Honduras	Caritas Honduras	1959
Camex	Mexico	Caritas Mexico	1973
Camex	Nicaragua	Caritas Nicaragua	1960
Camex	Panama	Caritas Panama	1970
Cono Sur	Paraguay	Caritas Paraguay	1958
Bolivariana	Peru	Caritas Peru	1955
Caribe	Puerto Rico	Caritas Puerto Rico	1969
Cono Sur	Uruguay	Caritas Uruguay	1962
Bolivariana	Venezuela	Caritas Venezuela	1963

== Leadership ==
=== Presidents ===
- ?–2007: Gregorio Rosa Chavez
- 2007–2012: Fernando María Bargalló
- 2012–2023: José Luis Azuaje Ayala
- 2023–present: Gustavo Rodríguez Vega

=== Regional Coordinators ===
- 2003–2007: Francisco Gerardo Hernández Rojas
- 2007–2011: Antonio Sandoval
- 2011–2023: Francisco Gerardo Hernández Rojas
- 2023–present: Nicolás Meyer
