= Truth and reconciliation in Colombia =

Colombia has been in the throes of civil unrest for over half a century. Since 1964, at least 3 million people have been displaced and about 450,000 have died. Four out of five fatalities were non-combatant civilians. Between left- and right-wing armed forces, paramilitary and/or guerrilla forces, and an often corrupt government, it has been difficult for Colombia to set up any kind of truth or reconciliation commission, leading to interventions from international organizations such as the Office of the United Nations High Commissioner for Human Rights and the International Center for Transitional Justice (ICTJ). Peace talks between the government of Juan Manuel Santos and the FARC, the main guerrilla force in the country, began in 2012 in Havana, Cuba and a final agreement was signed in 2016. Since then, the Truth Commission of Colombia was appointed to interview victims of violence and advocate for long-term solutions to the conflict. Its final report was published in June 2022.

== Historical context ==
The Colombian conflict revolves around the desire to control the population, land, natural resources, political power, and the drug markets.

The human rights violations that Colombia suffers from primarily include forced disappearances, summary execution and torture. The consensus on what is the root of the problem seems to be that Colombian law is not respected, even by those sworn to protect it. Justice was, and to a certain extent still is, in the hands of the individual. Armed groups can belong to any or more of the following: armed forces in the employ of drug lords and property owners, paramilitary groups linked to the country's security forces, and “death squads” in which off-duty police take the law into their own hands in order to kill criminals or people best disposed of. Civilians are killed for perceived involvement with any of the ‘other’ armed groups without proof or trial. It is a vicious circle fueled by the self-interest of many people that do not believe the law is effective and/or even right.

Furthermore, some sections of Colombia cannot be said to be fully under the government's control and by extension, its laws. It is an added problem that the landowners, drug lords and force leaders have become accustomed to not having to answer to anyone or anything. Both the security forces and insurgent groups have entered into alliances with known drug lords, thus establishing that drug cartels have a more than significant share of control in Colombia. The Special Rapporteurs remain concerned at the contrast between statements indicating high sensitivity to and awareness of human rights issues at the top level of the armed forces and their practices in the field, which very often fail to convey respect for human rights. Under the administration of President Gaviria (1990–1994), peace agreements were concluded with four armed insurgent movements comprising approximately 3,500 combatants. The FARC is the only one of the four guerrilla armies that resisted negotiations. Two of the disbanded armed forces became political parties in order to continue pursuing their goal in a diplomatic way. However, reinsertion of some ex-combatants into civilian life did not go very well, and this led some of these ex-combatants to return to the life of combat.

== Foreign Involvement ==
=== United Nations ===
The UN has sent special missions every year since 1989 but did not have much success. Its initial mission was to strengthen of the Government's capacity to care for the victims of violence, using the resources of the Social Solidarity and Emergency Fund (23 million US$), strengthening the judicial machinery and financial capacity of the office of the attorney general in order to better protect witnesses and victims and the promotion of mechanisms for safeguarding fundamental rights. In 1997 a permanent office was created in order to execute more direct observations and advice to the government of Colombia. The Office of the Presidential adviser for Human Rights’ job was and still is to monitor, respond to complaints, and travel to witness first-hand accounts of human rights violations. Also, they interview all people involved with the violations. This includes the victims, witnesses, national and ‘local’ armed forces and civil authorities. They then analyze the answers, and the behavior of those interviewed in order to discern what actions are being taken, considered or not. Finally they supply recommendations and function as advisers in judicial or institutional matters. Amidst it all they seek to promote and educate the people in the international rights they have. The special missions and even the more modern Office's job is to monitor every side of the conflict. Though they give their findings to the government of Colombia, it also is being critiqued. A recurring problem is impunity. Either through government corruption and/or judicial ineffectiveness lets criminals walk free.

The Administration of Gaviria encouraged the internal mechanisms ensuring that the security forces respected humanitarian law, but his stance towards the rebels in his country was to fight fire with fire, thus assuring that human rights violations were committed on all sides of the conflict.

The first person to hold the position of a Comisionado Nacional para la Policía, created in 1993 through Law No. 62 to coordinate the mechanisms of internal disciplinary control, said that his work was restricted by high-level police officials. President Samper, elected in 1994, appointed a High Commissioner for Peace with the mandate to explore possibilities and formulate proposals for a negotiated solution of the armed conflict in Colombia. In spite of this, however, there was no decrease in violence and/or human rights violations reported.

=== International Center for Transitional Justice (ICTJ) ===
The role of the ICTJ is similar to that if the Office of the High Commissioner of Human Rights. They work with the Supreme Court of Justice and the Tribunals of Peace and Justice in order to strengthen judicial capacity. They advocate victims’ rights and engage in truth-seeking. They also make a point of sharing their knowledge with the Colombians and the rest of the world.

=== Non-Governmental Organisations (NGO) ===
The following are some of the NGOs active in Colombia:

- The Alliance of Social and Like-Minded Organizations,
- The Permanent Civil Society Assembly for Peace,
- The coalition Colombia-Europe-United States Coordination Group,
- The Colombian Platform for Human Rights Democracy and Development

These four represent over 1.000 organizations around the country that are mostly international collaborations with Colombians. These human rights defenders are particularly targeted by the paramilitary groups that have by all appearances not been dismantled (see following section on Justice and Peace Law) and even the judicial and law enforcement systems do not follow through with prosecutions and in fact even commit violations against defenders as well. The insecurity of human rights defenders has gotten worse since the beginning of 2009, possibly because of the side-effect of the Defense and Democratic Security policy of 2002 (see following section of the same name).

=== Inter-American Commission on Human Rights (IACHR) ===
The IACHR helps many Human Rights Defenders get a measure of protection and interim measures for them and their families. Judges of the Supreme Court of Justice themselves had been forced to ask for interim protective measures from IACHR. They were being threatened for not ruling in the ‘right’ person's favor during what came to be called the para-politics cases in 2009, following the ‘official’ demobilization of the paramilitary forces.

== National Action ==
Depending on the President in power, human rights workers are either encouraged, in as much as they ever were in Colombia, or depicted as colluding with rebels. The attitude of "if you're not with us, you're against us" was common to most governments in power in Colombia. This causes significant worry for human rights defenders as they and their family are threatened regularly. Some tried to make some positive steps. From 2002 to 2009 Colombia accepted 11 special procedure mandates from the UN, and 15 of the 68 recommendations made were implemented. The following are examples of positive national action.

=== Head of the HRIHL Unit of the Vice-Presidency and the Minister of Interior and Justice ===
A position created in order to design human rights policies. According to them, they have been working to decentralize the government in the areas of public policy, and by extension strengthening local authorities so they can establish humanitarian policies in their areas with less interference. In 2008, the Ministry of Defense sought to integrate the Human Rights and International Humanitarian Law (HRIHL) into the planning of military affairs. This policy also let the HRIHL take the job of training law enforcement authorities, which led by 2009 to 97,097 members of the security forces trained on the work of human rights defenders.

=== The Special Adviser to the President on women's issues ===
This office is in charge of designing policies pertaining to women's rights and conventionalizing gender issues within the government. The fact that this office exists is a positive step for the women's rights in Colombia; however, the office is very much understaffed and underfunded.

=== Defense and Democratic Security Policy of 2002 ===
Under the government of President Álvaro Uribe, this long-term policy was enforced in the interest of reinforcing the rule of law by encouraging democratic authority and getting the population more involved in public issues. This policy has led to a marked improvement in the level of national security. For example, statistics have shown that the number of homicides have decreased by 44%, and the number of kidnappings by 88% between the years 2002 and 2008. On the other hand, by getting the population more involved, it has also encouraged people maintaining their own security, and leading to the stigmatization of human rights workers, journalists etc.

=== Justice and Peace Law of 2005–2006 ===
This law was part of a list of recommendations made by the annual report made by the UN. Through the implementation of this law, the government reports that the paramilitary groups have been demobilized. However, NGOs have contradicted this. Through a visit by a UN special rapporteur, it has been established that though the leaders and senior personnel of the paramilitary groups have been arrested, the “economic, command and control structures of paramilitaries do not appear to have been fully and effectively dismantled”.

=== The National Guarantee Round Table ===
Established in 2009, it consists of the Government, four human rights and peace coalitions and 16 social sectors. It aims at guaranteeing some measure of safety to the human rights defenders on the national and regional level and increasing levels of trust between civil and state authorities.

=== Intelligence Law of 2011 ===
Given that the institution of national intelligence has often been accused of obtaining information through illegal means, this law is a huge step forward in the country's cleansing of corrupt officials. The DAS was closed, and the new name for the Intelligence agency is National Intelligence Directorate. This law aims at limiting the purposes and actions of the intelligence agency. The law creates two commissions in view of its goal; one is to assist in the purging of intelligence files, the other is to monitor the activities of the agency. This law came about after the prosecution of many DAS directors and officials that were in power between 2002 and 2008; years in which there are many reports of them violating human rights in various ways.

=== Victims’ and Land Restitution Act of 2011 / Law 1448 of 2011 ===
President Santos signed this Act in June 2011 following the OHCHR's recommendation towards an amendment of Law 975 of 2005. The Act's purpose is to recognize and protect all victims of the armed conflict. For the first time, even the victims of government security forces and police authorities are protected and encouraged to contribute to the historical retelling. It also offers comprehensive reparations; some people will get their lands back but not all. It even has a gender approach. It is the biggest step Colombia has taken with regards to human rights; however, it doesn't consider members of the illegal armed groups that sprung up after the dissolution of the paramilitary groups. In addition, the Law 1448 of 2011 creates a Museum of Memory which "must perform actions aimed at restoring the dignity of victims and to disseminate the truth about what happened".

Though this Act is still the most promising reparative act to be enabled, continuing killings, displacement and other human rights violations jeopardize the extent to which Colombia can come to know a measure of peace

=== Support of local/community-based truth-seeking missions ===
The following are a few of the community-based human rights groups: Colombian Commission of Jurists, the Confederation of Colombian Workers, the Corporación Reiniciar, the Intercongregational Commission of Justice and Peace, the Advisory Office for Human Rights and Displacement (CODHES), the Regional Human Rights Commission (CREDHOS), the Colectivo de Abogados "José Alvear Restrepo" and the National Movement of Victims of State Crimes (MOVICE).

== Current Efforts ==
=== Peace talks in Cuba ===
In 2012, Colombia's president, Juan Manuel Santos (2010-2018) met with members of FARC in Havana, Cuba, in order to discuss peace. The peace talks were formally installed in Oslo, Norway, in October, but then moved to their permanent location in Havana in November. Cuba and Norway were present at each of the conferences in order to be guarantors of the process. The peace process is said to have started soon after Santos’ rise to power, but it must also be said that it was possible in large part because of the FARC's string of defeats since 2008. These defeats started once the US government started lending aid in the form of education of the Special Forces, guns, sophisticated technology and spy networks.

It was established that the cornerstone of the peace talks would be the issue of land redistribution. This was stated as the main reason for the beginning of the conflict and Colombia's government is seeking peace by addressing the original problem. The way in which this redistribution would be carried out is as of yet unclear but it would involve a ‘land bank’. The illegally obtained land would be distributed to the displaced, the landless and farmers would receive loans, varied assistance and protection both legal and political. The aim is to also encourage an agrarian revolution and help develop small farmers to be able to compete with large landowners.

In order for FARC to accept peace talks, President Santos promised the leaders they would not be extradited to other countries. Though this may look like an encouragement of impunity, Santos’ philosophy regarding this matter was “peace at any cost”. Thus the second issue raised was the reintegration of FARC leaders in the political arena. This would be achieved by loosening restrictions of forming political parties, and increasing representation in remote areas. Santo's political opponents, especially his predecessor Alvaro Uribe, condemned this decision as a “sell-out”. Many Colombians were also uneasy about having FARC leaders in positions of authority in their government or in their communities, especially since armed conflict is still going on between government Security Forces and FARC. The next item on the table was the eradication of the cocaine trade. “If they become our allies in order to destroy and eradicate these coca fields and destroy the corridors, can you imagine, not only for Colombia but for the whole world, what this means?” Santos said. “It would be a major, major achievement”.

By November 2012, FARC announced a ceasefire, though the Colombian government did not agree to it. In January 2013, FARC captured two policemen who were part of the Colombian government in order to attempt to force the Colombian government to stop bombing them. By February they were returned, and through multiple letters to US congressmen, more countries getting involved, and a soccer game for peace, they came to multiple partial agreements and proposals. Throughout 2013, members of FARC insisted that constituent assembly was the only way to change the political regime and reform political institutions, but the government was opposed to any changes to the constitution, fearing what might come from it. The government instead proposed a referendum, and in August 2013, proposed a bill that organized constitutional referendums necessary for implementation of the final agreement. They thought to hold it alongside the congressional or presidential elections of the following year, but FARC was so opposed to this idea that they closed negotiations and called for a pause in talks.

In August 2014, 12 survivors of the conflict and the negotiators for peace met in Havana, an event an event impacting many as it was the first official exchange between the victims face-to-face with the perpetrators. After a second meeting in September, both FARC and the Colombian government agreed that the survivors were the core of the issues, and it seemed to bring the two together in a way.

2015 spelled trouble when 11 soldiers were killed in a FARC ambush in April, and in retaliation, the military killed 26 of FARC's guerrillas. This resulted in FARC calling an end to its unilateral ceasefire that it had previously agreed to, and tension began to build again. In response to this, Cuba and Norway called on the two sides to continue efforts at a negotiated settlement, which resulted in a bilateral ceasefire due to the fact that the Conflict analysis resource center (Cerac) saw the lowest levels of violence since 1984 as a result of the unilateral ceasefire on FARC's side. Later that year there was more conflict as FARC sabotaged energy companies by spilling oil and bombing power plants. There was more pressure put on both sides by Norway and Cuba to resolve this conflict, and finally the proposal to set up a commission for truth was put into place.

Many Colombians called for retributive justice in which rebels would face justice for civilian deaths, kidnappings and other means of extortion that were commonly used. The FARC, however, refused to be prosecuted, though they did admit the possibility of “reviewing” some of their errors.

== Creation of Truth Commission ==
A peace agreement was reached between the two groups in June 2016. The government and FARC signed historic agreements on the end of the conflict including a cessation of hostilities and surrender of weapons during a ceremony in Havana. This was witnessed by representatives from Cuba, Norway, Mexico, the European Union, and the United States.

Among these agreements; which included comprehensive rural development, political participation, and an end to drug trafficking; was the creation of a truth commission, the Special Jurisdiction for Peace. The "Commission for the Clarification of Truth, Coexistence and Non-repetition" was to be focused on victims, their right to the truth, and was supposed to have a differential and gender-based approach, focusing on the way that different people were treated in terms of their role in society. The government and the FARC committed to contribute to the clarification of the truth and to recognize their responsibilities before the Truth Commission. The Truth Commission was to be composed of 11 members, chosen by the selection mechanism for the Special Jurisdiction for Peace and was supposed to work for three years, following a six months preparation period. As of 2018, according to, the commission had not yet achieved its aims, due to the 2018 presidential election and subsequent change in power. Alongside the Truth Commission was a search for missing persons so that they or their remains might be returned to their families.
