= Greci =

Greci can refer to:

== People ==
- José Greci (1941–2017), Italian actress

== Places ==
Italy

- Greci, Campania, a comune in the province of Avellino

Romania

- Greci, Mehedinți, a commune in Mehedinţi County
- Greci, Tulcea, a commune in Tulcea County
- Greci, a village in Petrești, Dâmbovița
- Greci, a village in Osica de Sus Commune, Olt County
- Greci, a village in Schitu, Olt
- Greci, a village in Mateești Commune, Vâlcea County
- Greci, the former name of Grădiștea, Ilfov
- Greci (river), tributary of the Măcin Branch of the Danube in Romania
- Greci, the highest peak of the Măcin Mountains
- Surdila-Greci, a commune in Brăila County
