= Comparison of Italian and Romanian =

Linguistic comparison

Italian and Romanian, although closely related Romance languages, differ in many aspects of their phonology, grammar, and lexicon. Italian belongs to a subset of the Romance languages known as Italo-Western, whereas Romanian belongs to the Eastern Romance group.

== Linguistic correspondences between Italian and Romanian ==
An important factor for linguistic contact between Italy and Romania is the similarity between their respective national languages.

Studies on this similarity, and in general on the linguistic concordances of Romanian and its dialects with other Romance languages and dialects, were initiated during the nineteenth century when, with the Transylvanian School, a cultural movement to rediscover the Latin origins of the Romanian language began. Numerous philological researches were conducted from the middle of the century to investigate and document these origins, and no less important was the impetus of these scholars in introducing the use of the Latin alphabet in Romanian instead of the Cyrillic alphabet.

=== General features of Romanian ===
Romanian is, among the major Romance languages, the closest one to Italian. The grammatical structure preserves the Latin declensions of the feminine singular genitive and dative, vocative, the neuter gender, and the four conjugations. A facilitating factor in the acquisition of Italian by Romanians is the similarity between the phonetic systems. The orthography of both languages has a good correspondence between phonemes and graphemes and uses similar systems to represent identical sounds in both Italian and Romanian, including: ce - ci - che - chi - ge - gi - ghe - ghi.

The Romanian phonological system includes all the phonemes of Italian except for a few consonant sounds: the [ʣ] of zaino, zero, the [ʎ] of figlio, foglia, and the [ɲ] of gnomo, regno.

=== Paralelism între limba română și italiană (1841) ===
The parallelism and relationship between the Italian and Romanian languages were dealt with extensively by Heliade Rădulescu, a politician, scholar, and militant for national unity, in the work Parallelism between the Romanian and Italian languages (Paralelism între limba română și italiană), in which he advocates first the simplification, then the total abolition of the Cyrillic alphabet, and the elimination from the language of non-Latin elements that were to be replaced with Italian words.

Heliade proposes a Romanian orthography inspired partly by Italian and partly influenced by the etymological principles of the Transylvanian School, theorizing a massive lexical Italianization, with the creation of an Italo-Romanian language.

In the essay he points out a large number of largely Italian neologisms that serve to demonstrate how, at a time when the influence of French culture was strong, the Italian language also served as a model and exerted an influence on Romanian language and culture.

To Italian neologisms, Heliade assigns the same ennobling and magnifying function that Latinisms, elevated synonyms, learned and rare forms have in the Italian literary language.

Italian loanwords for which Romanian has no equivalent
Romanian	Italian
afabil	affabile
adorabil	adorabile
colosal	colossal
implacabil	implacabile
inefabil	ineffabile
inert	inerte
mistic	mistica
pervers	perverso o pervertito
suav	soave
venerabil	venerabile

However, when he goes so far as to argue that Italian and Romanian are not different languages, but dialects derived from Latin, and to advocate a Romanian-Italian language with the need to replace Romanian words with "superior" Italian ones, he cannot avoid the criticism of several literary writers and scholars, including Mihai Eminescu.

=== The concordances of the Romanian language with southern Italian dialects ===
Studies on Italo-Romanian concordances saw their pivotal moment in the studies of Iorgu Iordan, published serially in the journal "Arhiva" between 1923 and 1928.

The scholar theorized the concordances of Romanian with Italo-southern dialects, trying to prove the existence of mutual relations between former Dacia and southern Italy until the 5th century.

In 1956, Italian linguist Giovanni Alessi in his article Concordanze lexicali tra i dialetti romeni e quelli calabresi, (Lexical concordances between Romanian and Calabrian dialects), did not only deal with lexical facts, but extended his observations to the syntagmas in which the terms recur. The scholar showed that certain terms that were believed to be preserved only in Romanian have equivalents in Calabrian dialects, such as:

- Romanian grangur - Calabrian gravulu
- Romanian luntre - Calabrian luntri

==== Differential Object Marking in Romanian and Sicilian ====
Linguistic similarity between Romanian and southern dialects is also found in the case of the Sicilian language.

The phenomenon of Differential Object Marking (abbreviated as DOM), or Prepositional Accusative, is grammaticalized and stable in Romanian, a Romance language with a much richer case system than the depleted one of Sicilian. In Sicilian, the phenomenon is present less systematically than in Romanian, perhaps due to the lack of established grammatical rules and the influence of the Italian language, which lacks the differential marking phenomena of the Direct Object.

From typological studies, it has been observed that the main parameters that can influence DOM are the traits of animacy, definiteness and topicality. Differential Object Marking is more sensitive to the parameter of definiteness for Romanian, while it is more sensitive to the parameter of animacy for Sicilian.

According to Case Marking Theory, the relationship between the elements of a sentence is shown as much by their morphology as by the word order within a sentence. Romanian inherited five cases from Latin: nominative, accusative, dative, genitive, and vocative. The nominative, accusative, dative, and genitive cases have the same endings for the noun, while all cases have different forms for the personal pronoun. In Sicilian, on the other hand, case traces can be seen in the tonic first and second-person pronouns in the accusative and dative.

==== Clitic doubling in Romanian and Sicilian ====
Both Romanian and Sicilian present the phenomenon of clitic doubling, that is, a double expression of the direct or indirect complement through a referential nominal and a co-referential clitic. The causative accusative or dative form is attributed to the clitic by the verb, and it agrees in gender and number with the direct or indirect object.

Examples of clitic doubling in Romanian and Sicilian
Italian	Sicilian	Romanian
Ho visto Giovanni	U vitti a Giuvanni	L-am văzut pe Ion
Ho dato a Maria un libro	Ci detti a Maria u libru	I-am dat Mariei o carte

==== The Vorposten area ====
In central Basilicata, within the Lausberg area, lies an area, called Vorposten, with Romanian-equivalent vowels, an obvious compromise between the "Sardinian" system in the south and the "common Romance" system in the north. This is an area in which, on the one hand, the Latin tonic vowel Ĭ collapses into the same outcome with Ē and Ĕ, and on the other hand there is the equalization of Ŭ with Ū and of Ŏ with Ō for the velar tonics. An asymmetrical tonic vowel system is thus delineated, a compromise between the evolved vowel system of Western-Romance and the archaic system of Sardinian, which within the Romance languages finds its only counterpart in the Romanian vowel system.

== See also ==
- Italians in Romania
- Association of Italians of Romania
- Romanian ethnic minority parties

== Bibliography ==
- Rotondi, A. (May 2017). "Il Grande Attore in Romania tra influenza italiana e francese e identità nazionale". Acting Archives Review (13): 47–84.
- Marinella Lorinczi. "Lineamenti di storia grafematica della lingua romena (dalle origini fino al XXI secolo)" (PDF). Lineamenti di Storia Grafematica della Lingua Romena (Dalle Origini Fino al XXI Secolo). Università di Cagliari.
- Rosanna Cima; Rita Finco. "I fondamenti della lingua romena". Imparare e insegnare tra lingue diverse. La Scuola.
- Dan Octavian Cepraga. "L'occidentalizzazione romanza del romeno letterario: Heliade Rădulescu e la traduzione della Gerusalemme Liberata". Diacronia. Università degli Studi di Padova.
- Iorgu Iordan (1923–1928). "Dialectele italiene de sud şi limba română". Arhiva.
- Giovanni Alessi (1954). "Concordanze lessicali tra i dialetti rumeni e quelli calabresi". Annuario della Facoltà di Lettere e Filosofia di Bari.
- Ana-Maria Braitor (2017). "Unità e diversità nella marcatura differenziale dell'oggetto diretto in rumeno e in siciliano" (PDF). Tesi di Dottorato. Università degli Studi di Palermo.
- Ana-Maria Braitor (2017). "La teoria della Marcatura del Caso". Unità e diversità nella marcatura differenziale dell'oggetto diretto in rumeno e in siciliano. Unità e diversità nella marcatura differenziale dell'oggetto diretto in rumeno e in siciliano. Università degli Studi di Palermo: 17–21.
- Ana-Maria Braitor (2017). "Il raddoppiamento clitico in rumeno e in siciliano". Unità e diversità nella marcatura differenziale dell'oggetto diretto in rumeno e in siciliano. Unità e diversità nella marcatura differenziale dell'oggetto diretto in rumeno e in siciliano. Università degli Studi di Palermo: 118–122.
- Federica D’Andrea, Carmela Lavecchia, Francesca Vittoria Russo, Carminella Scarfiello, Anna Maria Tesoro, Francesco Villone (2017). "I dialetti: patrimoni culturali locali nella lingua". Ianua. Revista Philologica Romanica. 17. Università degli Studi della Basilicata: 133–168.
