= Valea Adâncă River =

Valea Adâncă River may refer to:

- Valea Adâncă, a tributary of the Danube–Black Sea Canal in Constanța County, Romania
- Valea Adâncă, a tributary of the Greci in Tulcea County, Romania
