= Italians in Romania =

Romanian citizens of Italian descent

Italian Romanians
Italo-romeni (Italian) Italo-români (Romanian)
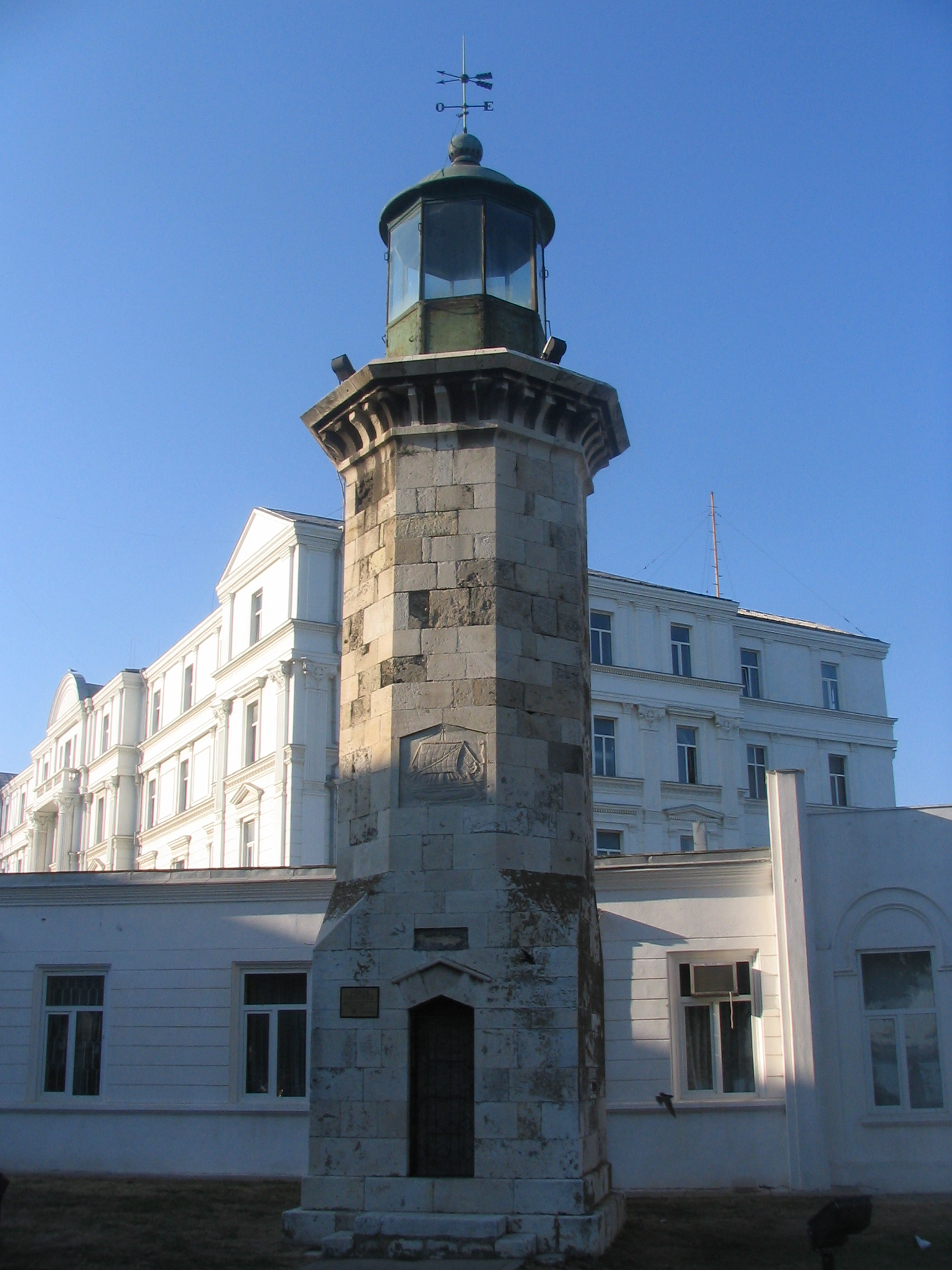
- The Genoese Lighthouse, built around 1300 by the Genoese who traded at the port of Constanța.

Total population
- c. 9,000 (by ancestry) c. 80,000 (by birth)

Regions with significant populations
- Suceava County, Bacău County, Galați County, Iași County, Constanța County, Brașov County, Prahova County, Vâlcea County and Timiș County) and in Bucharest

Languages
- Romanian · Italian and Italian dialects

Religion
- Roman Catholicism

Related ethnic groups
- Other Italians

Italian Romanians (Italian: italo-romeni; Romanian: italo-români) are Romanian-born citizens who are fully or partially of Italian descent, whose ancestors were Italians who emigrated to Romania during the Italian diaspora, or Italian-born people in Romania.

Italians have been present in Romania since the first half of the 19th century, when they emigrated from some Italian regions (particularly from Veneto and Friuli) to work in the mines, railway yards or construction.

== Characteristics ==
Italian Romanians are fairly dispersed throughout the country, even though there is a higher number of them in some parts of the country (particularly Suceava County, Bacău County, Galați County, Iași County, Constanța County, Brașov County, Prahova County, Vâlcea County and Timiș County), and in Bucharest.

As an officially recognised historical ethnic minority estimated at 9,000 Romanians of Italian ancestry, Italians have one seat reserved in the Romanian Chamber of Deputies. This was held by the Italian Community of Romania between 1992 and 2004, and the Association of Italians of Romania since 2004.

In recent years, the number of foreign-born Italians living in Romania has increased substantially. As of November 2007, there are some 12,000 foreign-born Italians in and around Timișoara. About 3,000 square kilometres of land (2% of the agricultural land of Romania) have been bought by Italians. Many are married to Romanians that they met in Italy, which now has the largest Romanian population in the world outside of Romania and Moldova.

According to Eurostat, in 2015 there were 38,580 persons born in Italy living in Romania.

By mid-2020, there were 80,000 persons born in Italy living in Romania. Italians in Romania represent the second largest immigrant group in Romania, after Moldovans in Romania. Among immigrants in Romania, in 2021, the most common countries of birth were Republic of Moldova (40%), Italy (11%) and Spain (9%).

== History ==
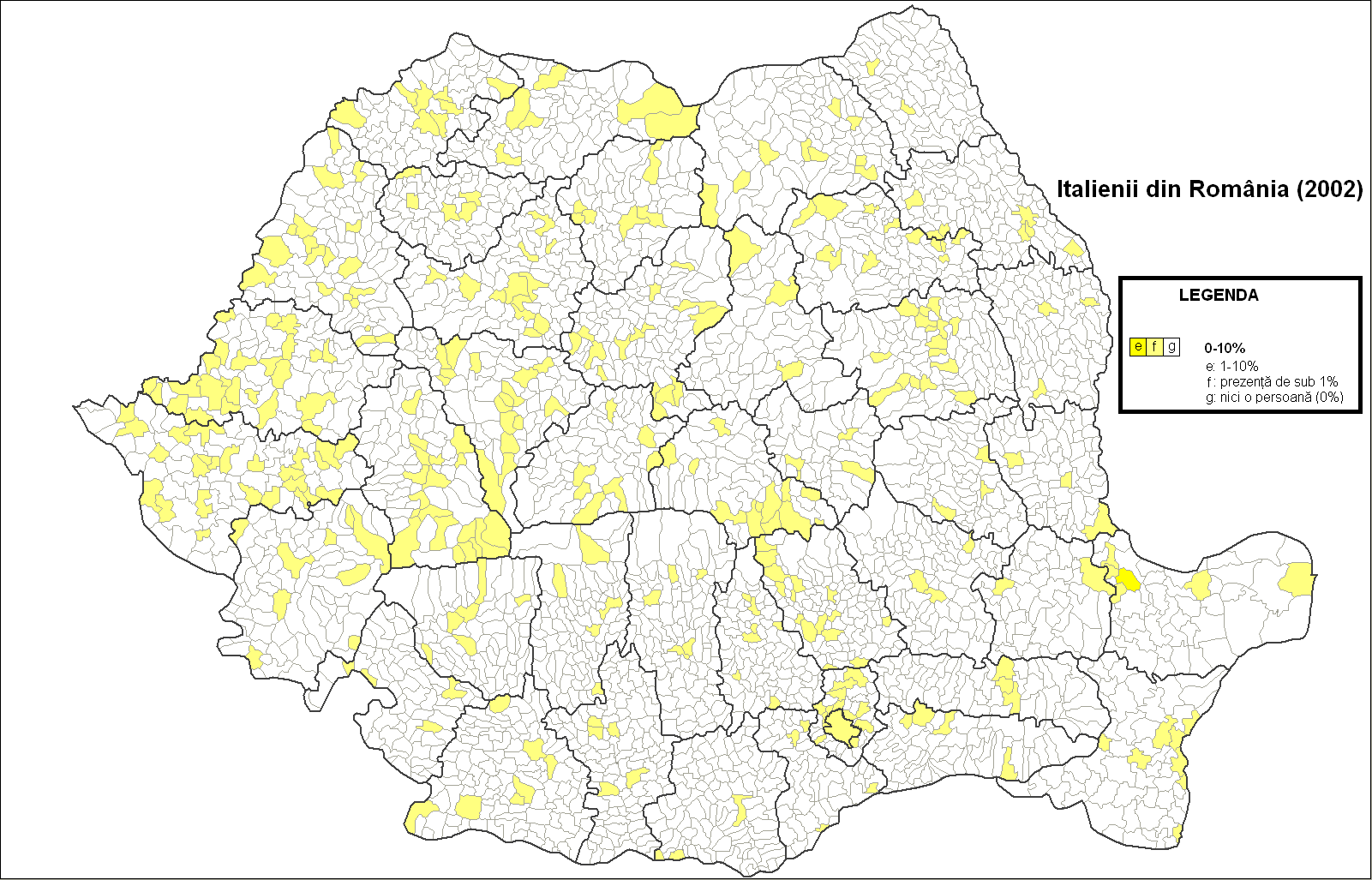
Italians in 2002 Romania

The territory of today's Romania has been part of the Italians' (especially Genoese and Venetians) trade routes on the Danube since at least the 13th century. They founded several ports on the Danube, including Vicina (near Isaccea), Sfântu Gheorghe, San Giorgio (Giurgiu) and Calafat.

The Genoese in the 13th century also created some colonies. The Turkish conquest massacred them, forcing the survivors to move elsewhere. Some managed to return to Liguria, but others remained in the area of Bessarabia and Dobruja. In fact, illustrious families of the Moldavian nobility—called boyarii (or boyars)—trace their origins back to some of these settlers. Such is the case of the Moldovan "Negruzzi" of the first half of the 19th century, a family to which Iacob Negruzzi and Costache Negruzzi belong.

Subsequently, the first Italians to emigrate permanently to the territory of present-day Romania were some families from Val di Fassa and Val di Fiemme (in Trentino) who, in 1821, were transferred to the Apuseni Mountains, in Transylvania, to work as woodcutters and lumberjacks on behalf of an Austrian timber merchant. At the time, Triveneto, as well as Transylvania, was included in the Austrian Empire; these movements were therefore facilitated by Austria, as part of a policy of internal migration between the poorest and border regions of the Empire.

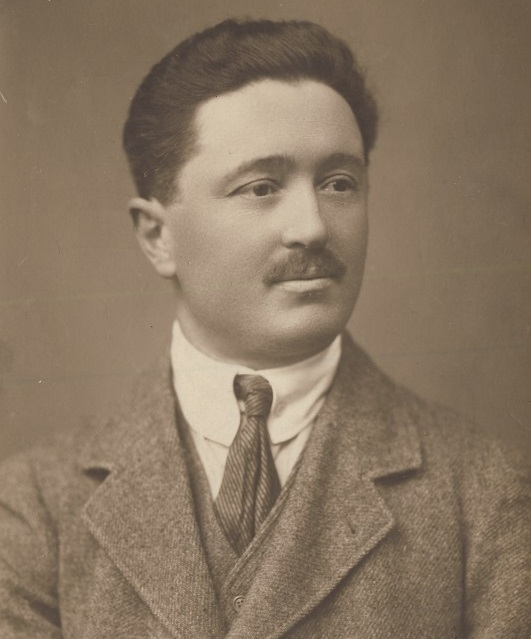
G. Magnani, one of A. Vlaicu's collaborators.

In the Kingdom of Romania, Italian emigration was incentivized by the Romanian authorities as the Romanian ruling class felt the strategic need to strengthen the link with Latinity in order to consolidate, on the one hand, the identity of the country, surrounded by "a sea of Slavs," and, on the other hand, to proceed with the "Romanization" of the newly annexed territories.

The migratory flow continued after the unification of Italy, not only towards Austro-Hungarian Transylvania but also towards the rest of Romania (Principality of Moldavia and Wallachia) which, with the independence obtained from the Ottoman Empire (1877), and following the annexation of Veneto to Italy (1866), on the occasion of the Third Italian War of Independence, it became a migratory valve that was important for the poor and overpopulated region. At the end of the 19th century, in fact, about 10-15% of the emigrants who left from Veneto headed for Romania, even if, often made up of seasonal migrations in the construction, railway construction, forests or in mines. The number of Italian emigrants in Romania went from 830 in 1871 to more than 8,000 in 1901, according to estimates by the Ministry of Foreign Affairs. After 1880, Italians from Friuli and Veneto settled in Greci, Cataloi and Măcin in Northern Dobruja. Most of them worked in granite quarries in the Măcin Mountains, some became farmers, and others worked in road building.

Italian emigration continued in the interwar period, reaching a peak of around 60,000 Italians in Romania in the 1930s, and gradually decreased in the 1940s. According to historical research, about 130,000 Italians moved to Romania between the end of the 19th century and World War II, most of whom returned to their homeland after 1945. Those emigrants who had renounced their Italian citizenship remained in the Romanian cities. Today the historical Italian minority is estimated at 9,000 Romanians of Italian ancestry.

In the 1990s, after the fall of Ceaușescu's communist regime, migration flows from Italy resumed and Italian emigrants were granted ethnic minority status and the right to elect their own parliamentarians.

A 2009 report indicates that Romania is home to about two hundred thousand Italians, centralized mainly in Banat and Transylvania, mostly employed in the restaurant industry. Italy continues to be since 2006, the leading investor country in terms of the number of registered companies, with about 20 percent of the total active presence, and there are 26,984 Italian companies employing 800,000 people. The 2021 Romanian census recorded 4039 ethnic Italians.

=== Italians in the Dobruja region ===
At the end of the 19th century, thousands of families, mainly from Veneto and Friuli, settled in the coastal region of Dobruja, "where the climate was benign and the land munificent." Italians were mainly employed in the construction industry, as miners, loggers or farmers.

According to statistics, in 1899 there were 1,391 Italians living in Dobruja; by 1928 the number grew to 1,993, representing one-fifth of the Italian population in Romania. Between the late 1800s and 1945, a total of 130,000 Italians emigrated to Romania, most of whom returned home at the end of World War II.

==== Italian and its dialects in Greci ====
At the beginning of the 20th century, 111 Italians lived in Greci, a village on the banks of the Danube in the historical region of Dobruja.

According to recent studies by Amelia Toader, about 40 families lived in the village in 1972, of which 20 were of Bellunese origin.

As of the 2002 census, the population of Greci is reported to be 5,656, with 94 Italians now in the third and fourth generations, fifth in some cases. Representatives of the third generation (who are now about sixty years old) speak Romanian as their first language, but many also speak Italian and Bellunese or Friulian dialect, steeped in Romanian expressions.

According to the testimonies of residents, including the president of the Association of Friulians of Greci, Otilia Bataiola, initially marriages took place only between Italians, and for daily communication, within the walls of the house, dialects were used, Friulian or Venetian depending on the origin.

Beginning with the second generation, mixed marriages began with members of a growing Romanian community: the beginning of the twentieth century was in fact marked by the policies of ethnic colonization and cultural homogenization of Dobruja implemented by the Romanian government, aimed at establishing an indigenous majority, thus counterbalancing the Turkish-Tatar presence that had been predominant until then.

The preservation of the language was made possible by religious celebrations in Italian in the village's Catholic church, held once a month, and by Italian courses at the village school.

The village has the Catholic church of Santa Lucia, built between 1904 and 1912 through a donation from the Vals family, and an Italian school, founded and built in 1932 by the Italians of the village. Teachers came directly from Italy, as did textbooks and uniforms for the children.

Until World War II, the priests were also Italian, but were later replaced by Romanian priests, initiating the loss of the use of the Italian language, also increased by the closure of the only Italian school in the village by the Romanian communist government.

The future of the Italians of Greci is at the center of academic discussion: some scholars see the increase in mixed marriages and the closure of the granite quarries, the main occupation of Italian workers, as the main causes of the inevitable disappearance of the village's ethnic Italian community.

=== Timișoara, "the eighth province of Veneto" ===
The city of Timișoara, capital of the Timiș County within the Banat region, has experienced a strong migration flow from Italy since the 1970s, particularly from the Northeastern provinces.

The main industries, almost all foreign, come mainly from Germany, the United States and Italy. The district is called "the eighth province of Veneto" because of the high number of regional companies that have relocated production to the area: there are almost 27,000 Italian companies and, as of December 2002, the number of companies with Veneto capital participation present in Romania was 2,038.

Geographical origin of the Venetian presence in Romania
Province	Number of firms	% of total Venetian firms	% of total Italian firms
Belluno	26	1.28%	0.21%
Padua	454	22.28%	3.67%
Rovigo	94	4.61%	0.76%
Treviso	434	21.3%	3.51%
Venice	225	11.04%	1.82%
Vicenza	417	20.46%	3.37%
Verona	388	19.04%	3.14%
Total	2,038	100%	16.48%

The Venetian language is the city's second language, and two weeklies are printed in Italian: Sette giorni and il Gazzettino.

==== "Casa Faenza" in Timisoara ====
The city of Timisoara has been twinned with Faenza since 12 March 1991.

Casa Faenza is a health facility active in Timisoara since the end of 2000, and is a semi-residential center for the treatment of the mental needs of children up to 16 years of age, built with the contribution of the Municipality of Faenza, the Faenza-Timisoara Friendship Committee, the Opere Pie, the Faenza section of the Italian Red Cross, several local companies and individual citizens.

==== Antenna Veneto Romania ====
Antenna Veneto Romania, established through an agreement between the Foreign Center of the Veneto Chambers of Commerce and the Chamber of Commerce, Industry and Agriculture of Timisoara, serves as a counter for entrepreneurs from Veneto who intend to start or consolidate economic relations with Romania and for companies from Veneto that have already relocated to the country.

During 2003, Antenna Veneto Romania concluded the first survey on the Venetian entrepreneurial presence in Romania. The survey is still the only quantitative analysis of the Venetian presence in Romania and, as far as Italian relocation is concerned, no complete official data are available to date.

== Linguistic minority and the Italian community ==
In Romania, Italian is a recognized language of a linguistic minority due to the 2005 National Law on the Status of Minorities.

Following the fall of the communist regime in 1989, the Romanian state granted Italian communities in the country the status of a linguistic minority and the right to be represented by their own parliamentarian in the Chamber of Deputies.

Since 1999, an estimated 20,000 Italians have arrived in Romania, settling in Bucharest, the Timisoara area and Transylvania, employed mainly in the restaurant industry.

The Italian community is organized through the Association of Italians of Romania (in Romanian: Asociaţia Italienilor din România, abbreviated as RO.AS.IT), a group founded in 1993 in Suceava by descendants of Italian origin settled in the Bukovina area, eager to revive the unity of the community of Italians in Romania. In 2004, the president of the Suceava Association became a member of the Romanian Parliament, officially representing the Italian ethnic minority.

Thanks to the Association, the teaching of the Italian language in schools was reintroduced after sixty years of interruption and is now active at the "Dante Alighieri" High School in Bucharest.

== Italian language and culture in Romania ==
Italian culture was introduced to Romania starting in the Middle Ages following a variety of routes. One point of reference was the relationship that Stephen the Great, Prince of Moldavia (1457-1504) had with the Republic of Venice and Pope Sixtus IV. The Moldavian prince maintained an extensive correspondence with the pontiff, who appointed him, after a large battle against the Turks, Athleta Christi, one of the highest titles in the Middle Ages.

In the relationship between the two cultures, the Romanians are the only Romance people who have retained the memory of Rome in their name. They always referred to each other as Rumâni, Români, while others called them Wallachians, Vlachs, Blachians, Volohi, which all meant "Romanic" or "speakers of a Romance language."

Traveling in Transylvania, Moldavia and Wallachia in 1532, Francesco della Valle in fact wrote:

Their language is a little different from our Italian, they call themselves Romei in their language because they say they came anciently from Rome to inhabit that country, and if anyone asks if they can speak in the Wallachian language, they answer in this way: Sti Rominest? Which means: Do you know Romanian, for the language is corrupted (...).

The Latin heritage has always represented the Romanians' strongest historical link with the West and has remained an important means of maintaining their identity over the centuries.

During the nineteenth century, the connections of culture and ideals between the two peoples, both of whom were involved in the struggle for national unity, intensified. A cult for Italy, the land of the Romans from which originated the army of Trajan, conqueror of Dacia, took root in the majority of Romanian intellectuals.

It was in this context that, in 1848, the Transylvanian poet Andrei Mureşanu composed the Romanian national anthem (official until 1918), shortly after the conference of Wallachian and Moldavian revolutionaries (the Adunarea naţională de la Blaj). The anthem contains a significant passage in which the cultural roots and strong connection to Latinity are emphasized:

Deșteaptă-te, române, din somnul cel de moarte,

În care te-adânciră barbarii de tirani!
Acum ori niciodată, croiește-ți altă soarte,
La care să se-nchine și cruzii tăi dușmani.

Acum ori niciodată să dăm dovezi la lume
Că-n aste mâni mai curge un sânge de roman,
Și că-n a noastre piepturi păstrăm cu fală-un nume

Triumfător în lupte, un nume de Traian!
Awaken thee Romanian from your sleep of death

Into which you've been sunk by the barbaric tyrants.
Now or never, sow a new fate for yourself
To which even your cruel enemies will bow!

Now or never, let us show the world
That through these arms, Roman blood still flows;
And that in our chests we still proudly bear a name

Triumphant in battles, the name of Trajan!

=== Italian theater in Romania ===
In the context of the theatrical relations in the second half of the nineteenth and early twentieth centuries between European countries, the relations between Romania and Italy are of particular interest. The presence of Italian performers on the Romanian stage was numerically greater than that of their French, German, or English counterparts, and the Italian language in Romania was conveyed, as in the rest of the world, by theater and opera.

One of the most important phenomena that fostered the Romance Westernization of the Romanian literary language was the large influx of translations of French and Italian literature. In the eighteenth century, the figure of the Italian poet Pietro Metastasio predominates with no less than nine translated texts: Italian melodrama arrives in Romanian principalities in peculiar ways in that the translations are not so much intended for stage performance as for reading only; they are also based not on the original Italian text but on some translations into the Modern Greek language.

In her essay Verismul italian şi literatura română. Teatrul italian în România: 1871-1911 (Italian Verism and Romanian Literature. Italian theater in Romania: 1871-1911), author Corina Popescu analyzes a particular element of the link between Italy and Romania: the presence of Italian verist drama and that of the Italian realist-verist actor on the Romanian stage, considering the relationship between language, literature, dramaturgy and theater.

=== The study of Italian in Romania ===
The course of the nineteenth century witnessed a real expansion of Italian studies in Romania. Many intellectuals demanded the inclusion of the Italian language in Romanian schools, and associations and institutes for the promotion of Italian language and culture emerged.

The most renowned promoters of Italian language teaching in nineteenth-century Romania, as well as authors of grammars, manuals and handbooks for study, are the Italians Gerolamo Abbeatici, Orazio Spinazzolla, Gian Luigi Frollo and Ramiro Ortiz.

==== Gerolamo Abbeatici ====
A teacher of Italian in Galați and Bucharest, he is known first and foremost as the author of manuals that testify to the zeal with which Bucharest's intellectuals attended Italian (and French) classes:

- Gramatica Italiano-Romanu, intitulată Instructorul Italian, published in Galați and Bucharest, 1848;
- Dialogu Italiano-Romanu, cu începuturi de Gramatica, în Lecțiuni. Dedicatu nobilei națiuni române, Bucharest: Imprimeria Statului, numită Nifon, 1860-1862.

==== Orazio Spinazzolla ====
The Neapolitan Spinazzolla authored grammars (such as the Romanian Grammar and Romanian-Italian Dialogues, 1863) and miscellanies to stimulate interest in Italian literature.

Spinazzolla requested his transfer from his professorship at the Santo Sava School (1850-1870) to the newly founded University of Bucharest, where he was the originator of a chair of Italian language and literature.

==== Gian Luigi Frollo ====
Frollo, a Venetian, was a professor at the King Charles I high schools in Brăila (1863-1869) and Matei Basarab in Bucharest (1869-1878), and a writer of grammars and dictionaries to provide schoolchildren with working tools:

- Lecţiuni de limba şi literatura italiană. Elemente de Gramatică, Lecturi şi traducţiuni, Brăila, 1868;
- Limba româna şi dialectele italiene, 1869.

As early as 1871, he denounced the "gallomania" of the coordinators of public education who, by placing the French language among the compulsory subjects and establishing a French chair in both universities, were proving to be more Catholic than the Pope. According to Frollo, the solution was precisely the study of Italian.

The professor demanded "that Italian be imposed by the authorities as it was a few years ago and as it still is in the trade schools, in the gymnasium in Brăila and the high school in Bârlad." His suggestion was to found a new chair in the Faculty of Letters: comparative philology of Romance languages and literatures.

==== Ramiro Ortiz ====
A native of Chieti, he was sent to Romania in 1909 by the Italian Ministry of Education as a lecturer in Italian language and literature.

A specialist in Romance philology, Ramiro Ortiz was a professor at the University of Bucharest for 24 years, where he founded the Italian language and literature seminar and the journal Roma (1921-1933).

He is considered, as well, the founding father of the Italian Institute of Culture in Bucharest. From 1933 until his death, he was professor of Romance philology at the University of Padua, where, in 1937, he created the Romanian language and literature lectureship.

==== Italian Cultural Institute of Bucharest ====
The Italian Cultural Institute of Bucharest was founded in 1924 as a private institution through the efforts of a number of prominent Italian and Romanian intellectuals including Nicolae Iorga, Eugen Lovinescu, and Ramiro Ortiz, the latter holding the first chair of Italian language and literature in Romania since 1909.

In April 1933 the Institute of Culture became an official institution of the Italian State but would be closed in 1948 by order of the Communist authorities. This situation would last for twenty years, until it was reopened following the signing on August 8, 1967, of the new Cultural Agreement between Italy and Romania.

Since 2002, the headquarters has been located in the northern residential area of Bucharest, and has an exhibition space, a lecture hall, a library with more than 10,000 volumes, and a space for language courses.

The institute is the only organization in Romania that organizes Italian language proficiency certification exams in cooperation with the Universities for Foreigners of Perugia (CELI) and Siena (CILS, DITALS).

==== The Italian School of Bucharest ====
In 1887, the presence in Bucharest of an Italian community of about 900 people is attested, which gave birth to a Mutual Aid Society and a school with a total of 83 pupils, 53 of whom were Italians.

In 1901, the community founded a Cultural Circle and joined the Dante Alighieri Society led by Luigi Cazzavillan, a journalist from Arzignano, Vicenza, who after the Serbian-Turkish war, where he participated as a war correspondent, moved to Bucharest.

Cazzavillan invested heavily in the Italian school, which took the name Regina Margherita and was built in 1901 on the street that now bears his name. For forty-seven years the school contributed to the spread of Italian education and culture, until it was closed by communist authorities in 1948. Cazzavillan's name is also linked to the founding of several newspapers such as Universul, one of Romania's leading newspapers of the period, and Frăția romano–italiana, a newspaper in which he tried to highlight the common aspects of these two peoples.

In the late 1970s, due to openness of the communist regime, a new Italian school, Aldo Moro, was founded by a group of Italian diplomats. The school was supported with an annual grant from the Italian state until 2006, when it ceased support due to insufficient numbers of enrollment. To prevent the school's closure, the Italian association "Liberi di Educare" privatized it, however, failing to guarantee a viable educational offer.

In 2018, through contributions from Romanian parents, the school reopened in a new location in Bucharest and with a new educational program. The new Italian Dante Alighieri School is a bilingual high school open to all. The director in charge from 2019 is Dr. Ezio Peraro, and the principal is Prof. Tina Savoi.

== Notable Italians of Romania ==
- Gaspar Graziani, ruler of Moldavia
- Mansi Barberis (1899–1986), music composer
- Livio Bellegante
- Florin Bogardo
- Sorana Coroamă-Stanca (1921–2007), movie director
- Mihai Fotino
- Mircea Grosaru (1952–2014), politician, lawyer, professor
- Adrian Marino
- Giovanni Magnani
- Horia Moculescu
- Alexandru Pesamosca
- Andi Gabriel Grosaru, Lawyer, Deputy
- Simone Tempestini, Romanian rally champion

== See also ==
- Italy–Romania relations
- Italian emigration
- Romanians in Italy

== Bibliography ==
- Audenino, P. (2008). Migrazioni italiane. Milano: Mondadori.
- Franzina, E. (2002). Storia dell'emigrazione italiana. Roma: Donzelli Editore.
- Rotondi, A. (May 2017). "Il Grande Attore in Romania tra influenza italiana e francese e identità nazionale". Acting Archives Review (13): 47–84.
- Scagno, R. (2008). Veneti in Romania. Ravenna: Longo Editore.
- Caritas italiana (2008). Immigrazioni e lavoro in Italia. Statistiche, problemi e prospettive. Roma: IDOS.
- Toader, A. (2003). La componente italiana della civilizzazione nella provincia di Dobrugia (Romania), Iaşi: (unpublished conference paper) Comunitatea Italiana din România.
- Toader, A. (1972). Descrizione del Dialetto Bellunese Parlato a Greci (Romania). Bucureşti: University of Bucarest.
- Dematteo, L. (2018). La Corsa verso la Romania degli imprenditori italiani. Circolazioni, asimmetrie e narrazioni, in A. Gouez (a cura di), Fabbriche d'Europa, Studi & Ricerche 69, Notre Europe.
- Popescu, C. (2000). Verismul italian şi literatura română. Teatrul italian în România: 1871-1911. Bucureşti: Editura Universitaţii din Bucureşti. Archived from the original on November 24, 2007.
