= Association of Italians of Romania =

Association of Italians of Romania - RO.AS.IT. Asociația Italienilor din România Associazione degli Italiani di Romania
- President: Ioana Grosaru
- General Secretary: Andi Gabriel Grosaru
- Founded: 1993
- Registered: 1996
- Newspaper: Piazza Romana; Siamo di Nuovo Insieme
- Ideology: Italian minority politics
- National affiliation: National Minorities Parliamentary Group
- European affiliation: European Democratic Party
- Chamber of Deputies: 1 / 330
- Senate: 0 / 136
- European Parliament: 0 / 33

Website
- www.roasit.ro/

The Association of Italians of Romania – RO.AS.IT. (Romanian: Asociația Italienilor din România – RO.AS.IT.; Italian: Associazione degli Italiani di Romania – RO.AS.IT.) is an ethnic minority political party in Romania representing the Italian community of the country. The main objective of the organisation is to preserve the traditions and customs of the Italian community and promote the Italian language, culture, and history. It is supported by the Department of Interethnic Relations and the Italian Embassy in Bucharest. In 2014, it joined the European Democratic Party (EDP).

== History ==
The party was established in 1993 in Suceava, Suceava County, Bukovina. It contested the 1996 general elections, but was beaten by the Italian Community of Romania (CIR), which retained the seat reserved for the Italian community in the Chamber of Deputies under the electoral law allowing political parties representing ethnic minority groups to be exempt from the electoral threshold only applied as long as they received 10% of the vote required for a single seat in the Chamber of Deputies.

The party contested the 2000 elections as part of the Italian Community of Romania, but ran separately in the 2004 elections and beat the CIR by 987 votes to win the Italian seat, with Mircea Grosaru becoming the party's MP. It has retained it in every election since. Following Grosaru's death in 2014, his son Andi-Gabriel became the party's MP.

== Electoral history ==
Election	Chamber of Deputies			Senate		
Election	Votes	%	Seats	Votes	%	Seats
1996	9,833	0.08	0	–	–	–
2000	Part of the Italian Community of Romania			–	–	–
2004	6,168	0.06	1			
2008	9,567	0.14	1	–	–	–
2012	7,943	0.11	1	–	–	–
2016	3,486	0.05	1	–	–	–
2020	4,170	0.07	1	–	–	–
2024	4,128	0.04	1	–	–	–

== See also ==
- Italians in Romania
