= Italian Community of Romania =

Ethnic minority political party in Romania

The Italian Community of Romania (Romanian: Comunitatea Italiana din Romania, CIR) was an ethnic minority political party in Romania representing the Italian community.

== History ==
The CIR contested the 1992 general elections, and despite receiving only 4,188 votes (0.04%), it won a single seat in the Chamber of Deputies under the electoral law that allows for political parties representing ethnic minority groups to be exempt from the electoral threshold. It retained its seat in the 1996 and 2000 elections, but was beaten by the Association of Italians of Romania in the 2004 elections, losing its seat.

== Election results ==
Election	Chamber of Deputies			Senate		
Election	Votes	%	Seats	Votes	%	Seats
1992	4,188	0.04	1			
1996	11,454	0.09	1	–	–	–
2000	21,263	0.19	1	–	–	–
2004	5,181	0.05	0			
