= Caritas Romania =

Romanian Catholic social welfare and relief organisation

- Confederația Caritas România
- Caritas România
- Abbreviation: CCR
- Established: 1994; 32 years ago (founded) — 15 June 1995; 31 years ago (registered)
- Founder: Romanian Bishops' Conference
- Type: Nonprofit
- VAT ID no.: 7426217
- Purpose: social justice
- Location: Bucharest, Romania
- Coordinates: 44.45565°N 26.09490°E
- Origins: Catholic Social Teaching
- Region served: Romania
- Services: social services, humanitarian aid
- Official language: Romanian, Hungarian, English
- President: Fr. Gheorghe Dunca
- Executive Director: Doina Crangasu
- Affiliations: Caritas Internationalis, Caritas Europa
- Website: caritasromania.ro

The Caritas Romania Confederation (Romanian: Confederația Caritas România) or simply Caritas Romania, is a not-for-profit social welfare organisation in Romania. It is a service of the Catholic Church in Romania.

Caritas Romania is a member of both Caritas Europa and Caritas Internationalis.

== History ==
After the Romanian revolution in 1989 and the end of communism, the Catholic Church resumed its charity work and the different Roman Catholic dioceses founded local Caritas organisations to systematically address the social problems of their communities, for example by distributing aid received from abroad among those most vulnerable.

In 1994, the Roman Catholic diocesan Caritas organisations active in Romania at that time established the Caritas Romania Confederation. The goal of this network organisation was to represent the interests of its member organisations at national and international level. Over the years, other diocesan Caritas organisations were established in the Greek Catholic eparchies and subsequently affiliated with the Caritas Romania Confederation.

One of the first important activities launched in 1994 was the home care programme, supported both financially and methodologically by Caritas Germany. Its goal was to provide support to the poor, elderly population especially in rural areas, by supplementing the care and informal assistance provided by relatives, neighbours and volunteers with professional services at a moderate costs.

Other activities implemented by Caritas Romania were the counselling of people with special needs, emergency response in emergency situations, such as caused by natural disasters (e.g. 2005 floods) or conflict (influx of Ukrainian refugees after the 2022 Russian invasion), and anti-drug prevention and counselling programmes.

The organisation is also active in advocacy and provides financial contributions to the humanitarian work of other Caritas organisations around the world, such as Caritas Haiti after the 2010 earthquake, Caritas Philippines after Typhoon Haiyan in 2013.

== Structure ==
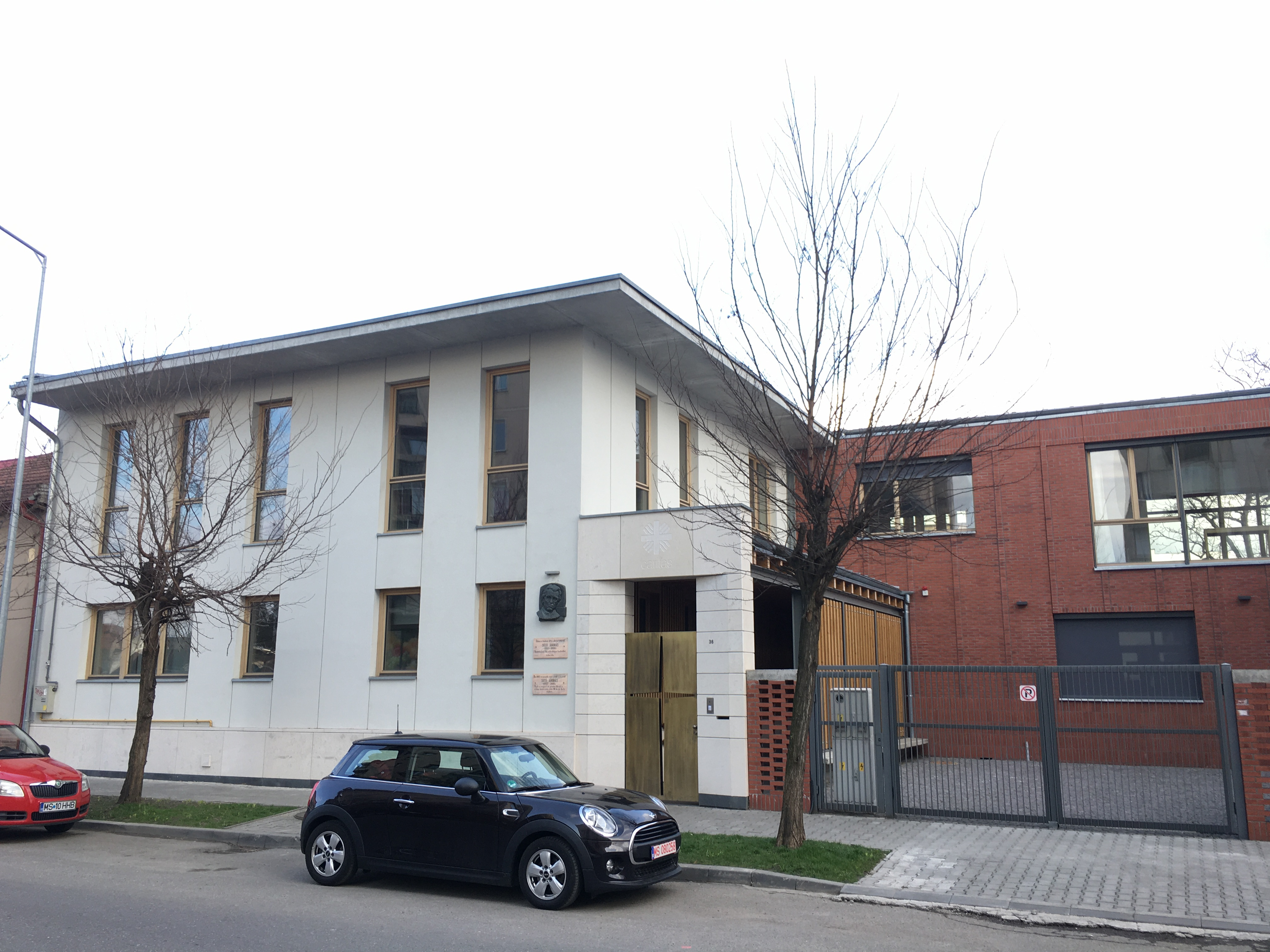
Building of Caritas Alba Iulia in Târgu Mureș

The structure of Caritas is the same as the structure of the Catholic Church in Romania. Caritas Romania consists of the national office located in Bucharest as well as of 10 regional, autonomous Caritas organisations in Romania. They work in four dioceses and two archdioceses of the Latin Church and in three eparchies and one archeparchy of the Romanian Greek Catholic Church.

The 10 local organisations are:

Member organisation (Romanian name)	Member organisation (English name)	Operating area	Established
Caritas Arhidiecezan Alba Iulia	Caritas Alba Iulia	Roman Catholic Archdiocese of Alba Iulia	1990
Asociația Caritas Mitropolitan Greco-Catolic Blaj	Caritas Blaj	Romanian Greek Catholic Major Archeparchy of Făgăraș and Alba Iulia	1998
Asociația Caritas București	Caritas Bucharest	Roman Catholic Archdiocese of Bucharest	1990
Caritas Eparhial Greco-Catolic Cluj	Caritas Cluj	Romanian Catholic Eparchy of Cluj-Gherla	?
Centrul Diecezan Caritas Iași	Caritas Iași	Roman Catholic Diocese of Iași	1991
Asociația Diecezană Caritas Greco-Catolic Maramureș	Caritas Maramureș	Romanian Catholic Eparchy of Maramureș	1998
Caritas Catolica Oradea	(Roman-Catholic) Caritas Oradea	Roman Catholic Diocese of Oradea Mare	1991
Caritas Eparhial Oradea	(Greek-Catholic) Caritas Oradea	Romanian Catholic Eparchy of Oradea Mare	2004
Organizația Caritas a Diecezei Satu Mare	Caritas Satu Mare	Roman Catholic Diocese of Satu Mare	1990
Federația Caritas a Diecezei Timișoara	Caritas Timișoara	Roman Catholic Diocese of Timișoara	1993
