= Andi-Gabriel Grosaru =

Romanian politician (born 1976)

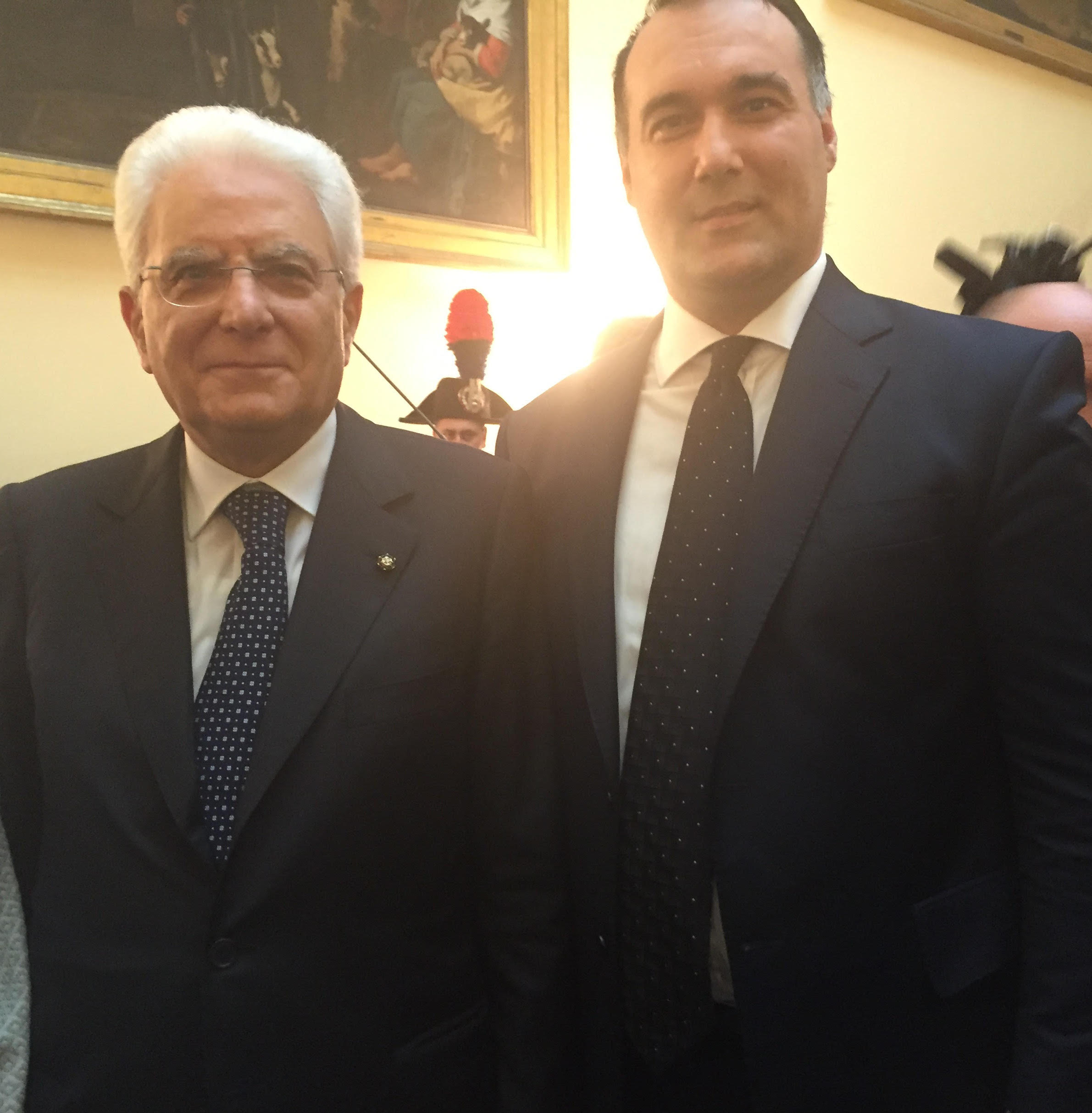
- Grosaru in 2017

Member of the Chamber of Deputies
- Incumbent
- Assumed office 21 December 2016
- Preceded by: Mircea Grosaru
- Constituency: Italian minority seat

Personal details
- Born: 4 December 1976 (age 49)
- Party: Association of Italians of Romania
- Parent: Mircea Grosaru (father)

Andi-Gabriel Grosaru (born 4 December 1976) is a Romanian politician of the Association of Italians of Romania.

Since 2016, he has been a member of the Chamber of Deputies. He is the parliamentary representative of the country's Italian minority, and succeeded his father Mircea Grosaru in the role. In 2023, he announced his candidacy for president of Romania in the 2024 presidential election.
