= Religious education in Romania =

The Romanian Revolution in 1989, which ended the Communist regime of Nicolae Ceauşescu in December 1989, offered the 15 religious denominations then recognized in Romania the chance to regain the terrain lost after 1945, the year when Petru Groza of the Ploughmen's Front, a party closely associated with the Communists, became prime minister. From that time, the Romanian Communist Party started a campaign of secularization, seeking to transform the country into an atheist state along Marxist-Leninist lines.

Beginning with the 1989 revolution, the legally recognized churches, especially the Romanian Orthodox Church, the country’s largest religious group, pressured the post-communist authorities to introduce religious education in public schools, offer substantial financial support for theological institutions and allow denominations to resume their social role by posting clergy in hospitals, elderly care homes and prisons. Although education was an area where churches registered success in the early stages of post-communist transition, religious education remains a low priority in Romania.

== Religious education under communism ==
Shortly after 1945, religious education came under the scrutiny of communist authorities and the Securitate. The Department of Religious Denominations, a governmental body dealing with religious matters since pre-communist times, continued to exist but was transformed into an agency enforcing stricter state control over religious affairs in the country. Recently it was revealed that the Securitate included a special department supervising religious life that tried to solve the so-called problem of the denominations, especially religious groups and individuals hostile to the new regime.

== Post-communist developments ==
After decades of officially-backed atheism, one of the first demands churches in that country put forth after December 1989 was the resumption of pre-university religious education in public schools. In January 1990, less than a month after communist leader Ceauşescu was killed by a firing squad and well before post-communist authorities had time to revamp the education system, the new Secretary of State for Religious Denominations, Nicolae Stoicescu, together with the Romanian Orthodox Church’s collective leadership structure, the Holy Synod, pledged their support for the introduction of religious education in public schools at all pre-university levels. An optional religion class, for which students were not to be graded, was to be included in the pre-university curriculum, with students declaring their religious affiliation in consultation with their parents. Students who were atheist or non-religious had the opportunity to opt out of the classes.

The Romanian Senate discussed the bill on 13 June 1995 in the presence of then Minister of Education Liviu Maior (representing the Social Democrats), with much of the discussion centering on Article 9, which recognized religion as a school subject. First, Gheorghe Dumitrescu, who sat on the parliamentary commission on education proposed that Article 9 read: "Mandatory school curricula include religion as a school subject. The study of religion is mandatory in primary school and optional in secondary school, the optional subject being ethics. The study of religion is also optional, depending on the religion and denomination of each student."

One change has been the reorganization of religious education, mainly in primary schools. Romania officially has more than 86% Christian Orthodox believers. Another 6% percent belong to the Catholic Church and 3% are Protestant churches. Muslims and Jews constitute less than 1% and have also started to implement their religious education in schools. In Romanian society, the number of people without any belief (unbaptized and not having been married in a religious setting) is very low, under 0.1%.

Nowadays, national polls show Romanian Orthodox Church to be one of the most trusted institutions in Romania. At this moment there are over 10,000 qualified teachers in public schools and the number is not enough. Their enthusiasm had provided a good assistance to people who were deprived by religious education for decades. Despite a shortage of qualified teachers in religion, many priests and students in theology accomplished in a successful way. The Romanian Orthodox Church has 37 high schools (seminaries) and, in higher education, 12 faculties of theology with over 9,400 undergraduate students specialized in Priesthood, School, Social Services and Sacred Arts.

Under the 1995 and 2011 education laws, students were to attend religious classes by default, and those who wished to opt out of them could only do so through a written request to the school director. The National Council for Combating Discrimination criticized this as an infringement on children's freedom of conscience. On 12 November 2014, the relevant articles of law were ruled unconstitutional by the Constitutional Court of Romania, effectively abolishing the de facto compulsory religious education in Romania. The Romanian Orthodox Church protested against the ruling, claiming it is a "humiliation" for religious education, however it has no means to challenge the decision.

== See also ==
- Romanian educational system
