= Greci (river) =

- Location within Romania

Location
- Country: Romania
- Counties: Tulcea County
- Villages: Greci

Physical characteristics
- Mouth: Danube (Măcin branch)
  - coordinates: 45.1480°N 28.1745°E
- Length: 13 km (8.1 mi)

Basin features
- Progression: Danube→ Black Sea
- Tributaries
  - right: Valea Adâncă, Negoiu, Dilcova, Caraba, Pricopanul

The Greci (also: Valea Plopilor) is a small right tributary of the Danube (Măcin branch) in Romania. It flows into the Danube near Turcoaia. Its length is 13 km (8.1 mi).
