= Freedom of religion in Romania =

Freedom of religion in Romania refers to the extent to which people in Romania are freely able to practice their religious beliefs, taking into account both government policies and societal attitudes toward religious groups.

Romanian law grants freedom of religion, outlaws religious discrimination, and provides a registration framework for religious organizations to receive government recognition and funding (although this is not a prerequisite for being able to practice in the country). The government also has programs for compensating religious organizations for property confiscated during World War II and during the rule of the Socialist Republic of Romania. Representatives of minority groups have complained that the government favors the Romanian Orthodox Church over other religious groups, and there have been several instances of local government and police failing to enforce anti-discrimination laws reliably.

During the existence of the Kingdom of Romania in the 19th and early 20th centuries, the government of Romania systematically favored the Orthodox and Romanian Greek Catholic Churches. Non-Christians were denied citizenship until the late 19th century, and even then they faced obstacles and limited rights. Antisemitism was a prominent feature of Liberal political currents in the 19th century before being abandoned by Liberal parties and adopted by left-wing peasant and later fascist groups in the early 20th century. During World War II, several hundred thousand Jews were killed by Romanian or German forces in Romania. Although Jews living in territories belonging to Romania prior to the beginning of the war largely avoided this fate, they nevertheless faced harsh antisemitic laws passed by the Antonescu government. During the Socialist era following World War II, the Romanian government exerted significant control over the Orthodox Church and closely monitored religious activity, as well as promoting atheism among the population. Dissident priests were censured, arrested, deported, and/or defrocked, but the Orthodox Church as a whole acquiesced to the government's demands and received support from it.

In 2023, the country was scored 3 out of 4 for religious freedom by Freedom House.

== Demographics ==
According to a 2011 government census, Romanian Orthodox Church adherents constitute 86.5% of the population and Roman Catholics almost 5%. According to the census, less than 1% of the population is Greek Catholic; however, Greek Catholics estimate their numbers at about 2% of the population. Other religious groups include Old Rite Russian Christians; Protestants, including Reformed Protestants, Pentecostals, Baptists, Seventh-day Adventists, and other Protestant denominations; Jews; Muslims; Jehovah’s Witnesses; Baháʼís; The Church of Jesus Christ of Latter-day Saints; Zen Buddhists; the Family Federation for World Peace and Unification; and the International Society of Krishna Consciousness. Atheists and nonbelievers represent less than 1% of the population.

According to the census, Old Rite Russian Christians are mainly located in Moldavia and Dobruja. Most Muslims live in the southeast around Constanta. Most Greek Catholics reside in Transylvania. Protestants of various denominations and Roman Catholics reside primarily in Transylvania. Orthodox and Greek Catholic ethnic Ukrainians live mostly in the north. Orthodox ethnic Serbs are found primarily in Banat. Members of the Armenian Apostolic Church are concentrated in Moldavia and the south. Virtually all members of the Protestant Reformed and Unitarian Churches of Transylvania are ethnic Hungarians. More than half of the Roman Catholic and evangelical Lutheran churches in Transylvania are composed of ethnic Hungarians. Approximately 40 percent of the country’s Jewish population of 3,400 resides in Bucharest.

== History ==
=== Background ===
Throughout the Middle Ages and the early modern era prior to its independence in the 19th century, the region corresponding to modern Romania was divided between several different polities. During the Middle Ages, the Orthodox Church held extensive power in the Dobruja (controlled by the Second Bulgarian Empire before becoming briefly independent in the 14th century) as well as the independent principalities of Wallachia and Moldavia, whereas the Kingdom of Hungary which controlled Banat, Crişana, Maramureş and Transylvania was controlled by a Catholic aristocracy that considered Eastern Orthodoxy to be heretical.

The Ottoman Empire annexed Dobruja in the 14th century, and forced Wallachia and Moldavia to become its tributaries in the 15th. Muslim Nogai Tatars settled in Dobruja, and local gypsy tribes converted to Islam as well. In the 16th century, the Ottomans captured the majority of Banat from Hungary. Meanwhile, the Reformation was spread to territories controlled by John Sigismund Zápolya. Villages were allowed to elect their own pastors, but in practice, only the Catholic, Lutheran, Calvinist, and Unitarian faiths received privileged status. Eastern Orthodoxy and Judaism were tolerated while other religions were forbidden.

During this period, government policy toward Jews varied significantly from one ruler or polity to another; at times Jews were encouraged to settle in these lands, and at others they were harassed, attacked in pogroms, or expelled. Jews were more consistently favored in territories controlled directly by the Ottoman Empire, although they were later persecuted by the Ottoman Empire's armies in the 18th century.

By the late 18th century, Moldavia, Wallachia, and Transylvania were at the crossroads of three major empires: the Ottoman Empire, the Habsburg monarchy, and the Russian Empire. Under Habsburg rule, the Catholic monarchy attempted to convert the region to Catholicism. Protestant churches were handed over to Catholics, and those who broke with the Catholic Church were punished by flogging. Habsburg policies deprived Orthodox churches of tithes, which were redirected to Catholic (or sometimes Protestant) churches, and the monarchy pressured Orthodox clergy to convert to the Romanian Greek Catholic Church, which retained Orthodox rituals but shared doctrinal points with the Catholic Church, including acknowledging the authority of the Pope. Imperial decrees officially established the Orthodox and Greek Catholic Churches as being equal to the Catholic Church, but these decrees were not enforced in practice. Demands for full religious equality were a core part of the early Romanian nationalist movement in the Habsburg Empire in the late 18th century, but these were denied by the empire, which granted Orthodox Christians the freedom to practice their religion but denied their church formal recognition.

During the Wallachian Revolution of 1848, anti-Jewish restrictions were passed but rarely enforced, and the Proclamation of Islaz, the primary political document issued by the revolutionists, called for the "emancipation of Israelites and political rights for all compatriots of different faiths. After the end of the Crimean War, various political factions courted the support of the Jewish community by promising them full equality. Conversion to Christianity was officially encouraged by the authorities, but was seldom practiced by Jews.

=== Kingdom of Romania ===
In 1862, Wallachia and Moldavia united to form the United Romanian Principalities. Their population was predominantly Orthodox Christian, with Jews forming the next largest religious group with only 3% of the population. During this period, Jews in Moldavia were frequently attacked by soldiers and civilians, who used scissors to shred Jewish people's clothing (and sometimes to shear men's beards and sidelocks) following the passage of clothing regulations for Jews. This behavior was put to a violent end by the intercession of the Army Headquarters.

In 1866, a constitution was adopted, which officially provided for the freedom of religion and conscience, but also barred non-Christians from citizenship and established the Orthodox Church as the "dominant religion" of the state. The ban against non-Christians was removed in 1879, but in practice the new provisions still made it extremely difficult for Jews to obtain citizenship. Jews were heavily persecuted, facing both discrimination in employment and being targeted by pogroms, drawing protest from the British government, and many Jews fled to the United States during this period.

The United Principalities became the Kingdom of Romania in 1881. Vocal Jewish activists were deported under the pretense of being "objectionable aliens". In 1893, a law was passed to bar the admission of Jewish children into public schools, and in 1898 they were also barred from attending high schools and universities. In the late 19th and early 20th century, antisemitism fell out of vogue in Liberal political circles but was increasingly endorsed by radical left-wing political movements primarily led by peasants, which claimed to face systemic oppression at the hands of Jews.

==== Interwar period ====
As part of the treaties ending World War I, Romania agreed to reverse its policies against Jews, establishing the effective emancipation of Jews. This decision was met with rioting by far-right groups, although many of the issues motivating earlier antisemitic left-wing groups were resolved in this period by the adoption of land reforms which favoured peasants. A new constitution was adopted in 1923, which continued to promise the freedom of religion and conscience for the people of Romania. In addition to maintaining the Orthodox Church as the "dominant religion", the Greek-Catholic church was given a status of "primacy before other faiths".

This period saw the rise of antisemitic fascist political parties, particularly the Iron Guard. In 1938, King Carol II abolished the existing constitution, and replaced it with the 1938 Constitution, outlawing political parties and establishing a royal dictatorship. In 1940, Carol II was forced to step down, and Romania became the National Legionary State, a fascist government led by a coalition between Ion Antonescu and Horia Sima, the leader of the Iron Guard; Romania consequently joined the Axis powers in 1940. This power sharing agreement was unstable, and the Iron Guard staged a coup in 1941, which included an anti-Jewish pogrom in Bucharest, and which was crushed by Antonescu with German support.

=== World War II ===
Romania entered World War II following the German invasion of the Soviet Union in 1941, occupying Bessarabia, Bucovina, and Transnistria. The Romanian and German troops massacred at least 160,000 local Jews in these territories; more than 105,000 Jews and about 11,000 Gypsies died during their deportation from Bessarabia to Transnistria. However, the vast majority of the Jewish population of Moldavia, Wallachia, Banat and Southern Transylvania survived, although their fundamental rights were limited. In early 1943, Antonescu reversed some anti-Jewish policy and halted the deportation of Jews to extermination camps as he began to seek reconciliation with the Allies. After the German occupation of Hungary in March 1944, about 132,000 (mainly Hungarian-speaking) Jews were deported to extermination camps from Northern Transylvania with the Hungarian authorities' support.

=== Socialist Republic of Romania ===
==== Gheorghe Gheorghiu-Dej secretaryship (1945–1965) ====
In the aftermath World War II, Romania was occupied by Soviet forces, which laid the groundwork for the establishment of the Socialist Republic of Romania. While several thousand Orthodox priests were jailed during this period for opposition to the government, the church itself did not suffer mass persecution, and in some cases even benefited from collaboration with the government. Religious organisations were allowed to operate, but were closely monitored by the government, and leadership of religious organisations needed to receive government approval. Religious leaders were encouraged to conduct sermons that combined a synthesis of religious and Marxist–Leninist values. The state also established anti-religious organisations which promoted atheism in the population.

The 1948 Constitution of Romania, modelled after the 1936 Constitution of the Soviet Union, provided for individual religious freedom but banned religious education, and the state promoted atheism in keeping with its ideology of Marxism–Leninism. Political parties organised along religious lines were banned. That same year, the government nationalised all church property in Romania. It would also disband the Romanian Greek Catholic Church, merging it with the Romanian Orthodox Church. Changes in church doctrines were presented by religious leaders and the government as being the result of the population's embrace of communism.

Unlike other Eastern Bloc states where clergy were forced to rely on donations or subsistence wages, Orthodox clergy in Romania were paid a salary equivalent to the average received by the general population, and received significant state subsidies for the reconstruction of churches destroyed in the war. Starting in the 1960s, the state used religious officials of the Orthodox Church as ambassadors to the West, engaging in dialogue with religious organisations in the United Kingdom.

==== Nicolae Ceaușescu's secretaryship (1965–1990) ====
Nicolae Ceaușescu, who came to power in 1965, at first expanded the cooperation between the Romanian state and religious organisations. Monastery closures were halted, and new churches were constructed with state backing, and the observation of Orthodox rites by communists was tolerated. Churches were permitted to build networks of Sunday schools.

Following the death of Patriarch Justinian in 1977, the state began a new anti-church campaign, engaging in urban renewal projects that entailed the destruction of churches. In 1979, Father Gheorghe Calciu-Dumitreasa was sent into exile for preaching against atheism. He and other dissident priests were defrocked by the authority of the church leadership.

With the exception of an evangelical Protestant minority, religious leaders largely avoided criticising the government or its policies until the very end of the socialist regime.

=== Post-socialist era (1990–present) ===
Following the end of socialist rule in Romania in 1990, Romania adopted a new constitution in 1991, which was further revised in 2003. Much like previous Romanian constitutions, this constitution upholds the freedom of conscience and religious belief.

== Legal framework ==
The constitution prohibits restricting freedom of thought, opinion, conscience or religious beliefs, as well as prohibiting forcing individuals to espouse a religious belief contrary to their convictions. It stipulates all religions are independent from the state and have the freedom to organise "in accordance with their own statutes" under terms defined by the law. The law specifies the state’s recognition of the "important role of the Romanian Orthodox Church" as well as the role of "other churches and denominations as recognised by the national history" of the country.

The constitution also states religious denominations shall be autonomous and enjoy state support, including the facilitation of religious assistance in the army, hospitals, penitentiaries, retirement homes, and orphanages. The law forbids public authorities or private legal entities from asking individuals to specify their religion, with the exception of the census.

=== Classification of religious organisations ===
The provisions of the law devoted to religion stipulate a three-tier system of religious classification with "religious denominations" at the highest level, followed by "religious associations," and "religious groups" at the most basic level. Organisations in the top two tiers are legal entities, while religious groups are not. Under separate provisions of the law governing associations and foundations, civil associations may also engage in religious activities and have the status of legal entities.

Both religious denominations and religious associations may own or rent property, publish or import religious literature, proselytise, establish and operate schools or hospitals, own cemeteries, and receive tax exemptions on income and buildings used for religious, educational, or other social purposes. Religious groups have no legal status to engage in such activities; however, they may practice their religious beliefs, including in public.

The law entitles all types of religious organisations to bury their deceased members in cemeteries belonging to other religious organisations – with the exception of Jewish and Muslim cemeteries – in localities where they do not have cemeteries of their own and where there is no public cemetery. Public cemeteries must have separate sections for each religious denomination if requested by the denominations operating in the locality.

==== Religious denominations ====
By law, there are 18 religious organisations recognised as "religious denominations," all of which were in existence at the time the specific law on religion was enacted in 2006. They include the Romanian Orthodox Church; Orthodox Serb Bishopric of Timișoara; Roman Catholic Church; Greek Catholic Church; Old Rite Russian Christian (Orthodox) Church; Reformed (Protestant) Church; Christian Evangelical Church; Romanian Evangelical Church; Evangelical Augustinian Church; Lutheran Evangelical Church; Unitarian Church; the Baptist Church; Pentecostal Church; Seventh-day Adventist Church; Armenian Apostolic Church; Federation of Jewish Communities; Muslim Denomination (Sunni Islam); and Jehovah’s Witnesses.

For additional organisations to obtain recognition as religious denominations, the law specifies they must demonstrate 12 years of continuous activity since the law’s passage, which cannot occur before 2018. After it demonstrates 12 years of continuous activity, a religious association is eligible to apply for the status of religious denomination if it has a membership of 0.1 percent of the population (approximately 21,500 persons) or more.

Religious denominations are eligible for state financial and other support. They have the right to teach religion classes in public schools, receive government funds to build places of worship, partially pay clergy salaries with state funds, broadcast religious programming on radio and television, and apply for broadcasting licenses for their own stations. Under the law, the amount of state funding a denomination receives is determined by the number of adherents reported in the most recent census, as well as by "the religious denomination’s actual needs."

Legal provisions allow local authorities to fund places of worship and theological schools belonging to religious denominations, including providing funding for staff salaries and building maintenance, renovation, and conservation or construction of places of worship. No similar provisions exist for religious associations or other associations engaged in religious activities; however, these associations may receive funding through legal provisions for civil associations and foundations.

The law allows clergy from recognised religious denominations to minister to military personnel. This includes the possibility of clergy functioning within the Ministry of Defense, Ministry of Interior, Intelligence Service, Foreign Intelligence Service, Protection and Guard Service, Special Telecommunications Service, and General Directorate for Penitentiaries. Under various other arrangements, clergy of recognised religious denominations, and in some cases religious associations, may enter hospitals, orphanages, and retirement homes to undertake religious activities. Religious denominations and religious associations may undertake activities in penitentiaries, subject to approval by the director of the detention facility.

==== Religious associations ====
The law defines a religious association as an organisation of at least 300 citizens who share and practice the same faith and that has attained legal status through registration with the Registry of Religious Associations in the office of the clerk of the court where the main branch of the association is located. To register, religious associations must submit to the government their members’ personal data (e.g., names, addresses, personal identification numbers, and signatures), which the law says may not be shared with other public institutions or used in any other way. To operate as religious associations, organisations also require approval from the National Secretariat for Religious Denominations, which is subordinated to the Prime Minister’s Office. As of 2019, 36 groups have been registered as religious associations, up from 35 in 2018, 33 in 2017 and 26 in 2016.

Religious associations do not receive government funding, but both they and religious denominations receive tax exemptions on income and buildings used for religious, educational, or other social purposes. Religious groups do not receive either government funding or tax exemptions.

==== Religious groups ====
The law defines a religious group as a group of individuals who share the same beliefs. Religious groups do not have to register to practice their religion and do not need approval from the national secretariat to operate.

Religious groups continued to state they viewed the 300-person membership requirement and the need to submit their members’ personal data for registration as a religious association as discriminatory because other types of associations only required three members and did not have to submit the personal data of their members. They also continued to criticise the three-tier classification system for religious organisations.

==== Civil associations ====
Civil associations engaged in religious activities function like secular associations and foundations; however, they do not receive the same benefits as religious denominations or religious associations. Civil associations may not qualify under the numerical/administrative criteria (300 members) for recognition as religious associations or may choose not to apply for such recognition. These associations do not require approval from the National Secretariat for Religious Denominations to operate. Their registration falls under the provisions of law governing the establishment of foundations, associations, and nongovernmental organisations (NGOs), which require a minimum membership of three individuals. Such civil associations are not required to submit their members’ personal data.

Civil associations engaged in religious activities may engage in religious worship. While they do not receive the same tax exemptions or other benefits granted to religious denominations and religious associations, they may receive the tax advantages and other benefits accruing to civil associations and foundations.

=== Religious work permits ===
The law allows religious workers from legally recognised religious organisations to enter and remain in the country under an extended-stay visa. Visa applicants must receive approval by the State Secretariat for Religious Affairs and submit evidence they represent religious organisations legally established in the country. The secretariat may extend such visas for up to five years.

=== Restitution of confiscated properties ===
The law provides for the restitution of religious properties confiscated between 1940 and 1989, during World War II and the duration of the Socialist Republic of Romania, as long as the properties are in the possession of the state. In accordance with socialist-era legislation on the status of religions, if the majority of a "local community of believers" changed their religion, the properties of the church they had left followed them to the new church. The communist regime also outlawed the Greek Catholic Church, forced church members to convert to Orthodoxy, and confiscated all church property. It transferred all places of worship and parish houses to the Romanian Orthodox Church and most other properties (land and buildings) to the state.

Under the law, if a confiscated property is used "in the public interest," such as for a school, hospital, or museum, and is returned to its previous owner, the current occupants are allowed to stay in it for 10 years after the restitution decision and pay a capped rent. The law does not address the general return of properties currently used as places of worship. Although the provisions of the law on restitution state a separate law will be adopted to address such cases, to date there is no such law.

A separate statute on the reinstatement of the Greek Catholic Church regulates the restitution of properties to the Greek Catholic Church from the Romanian Orthodox Church. Restitution decisions are made by a joint commission representing the two churches and based on "the will of the believers from the communities that possess these properties." The Greek Catholic Church may pursue court action if attempts to obtain restitution of its properties through dialogue are unsuccessful.

The law establishes a points system of compensation in cases where in-kind restitution is not possible. Religious groups may use the points only to bid on other properties in auctions organised by the National Commission for Real Estate Compensation (NCREC). The NCREC also validates compensation decisions of other local or central authorities, including those of the Special Restitution Commission (SRC), which decides on restitution claims filed by religious denominations and national minorities. The law establishes a 240-day deadline by which claimants must submit additional evidence in their cases at the specific request of the entity in charge of resolving their restitution claim. If a claimant does not meet the deadline, the administrative authority may reject the case. The authority may extend the deadline by an additional 120 days if the claimants prove they made a concerted effort to obtain the evidence, usually in the possession of other state authorities, but were unable to do so.

The law nullifies acts of forced "donations" of Jewish property during WWII and the socialist era, and lowers the burden of proof for the previous owners or their heirs to obtain restitution. The law designates the present-day Federation of Jewish Communities of Romania as the legitimate inheritor of forfeited communal Jewish property and accords priority to private claims by Holocaust survivors. The law does not address heirless or unclaimed property left by Holocaust victims.

=== Anti-discrimination laws ===
The law bans discrimination on religious grounds in all areas of public life. It also bans religious defamation and stirring conflict on religious grounds, as well as public offences against religious symbols. Penalties may include fines varying from 1,000 to 100,000 lei ($260 to $25,800), depending on whether the victim is an individual or a community.

The law prohibits establishment of fascist, Legionnaire, racist, or xenophobic organisations, which it defines in part as groups that promote violence, religiously motivated hatred, or antisemitism. Penalties for establishing such organisations range from three to 10 years’ imprisonment and the loss of certain rights. Criminal liability is waived if the person involved in establishing such an organisation informs authorities before the organisation begins its activity; penalties are halved if the individual helps authorities with the criminal investigation. Legislation also makes manufacturing, selling, distributing, owning with intent to distribute, and using Legionnaire symbols illegal. Penalties range from three months’ to three years’ imprisonment.

== Government practices ==
The Jehovah’s Witnesses reported that in several areas of the country, some members have encountered opposition to their activities and threats from Romanian Orthodox priests, police, and public authorities. These incidents included threats of violence. In some instances, police directly participated in the anti-Jehovah's Witness activities; in others, they censured those who were harassing the Jehovah's Witnesses.

A Roman Catholic official said the National Audio-Visual Council, a government-appointed entity that monitors broadcast content and issues broadcasting licenses, repeatedly rejected requests for local radio licenses to allow the Catholic "Radio Maria" network to expand the number of stations on which it broadcast.

Minority religious groups, including the Christian Evangelical Church, reported authorities continued to allow only the Romanian Orthodox Church to play an active role in the annual opening ceremonies at schools and other community events and usually did not invite other religious groups to attend such ceremonies.

The government-established Elie Wiesel National Institute for Studying the Holocaust in Romania reported in 2017 that prosecution of anti-Semitic speech and Holocaust denial remained a rare occurrence. According to statistics released by the government, during the year, the national-level Prosecutor General’s Office compiled a list of 42 cases to be resolved. Of those cases, the office reportedly resolved one case through a waiver of criminal prosecution (defined as there being no public interest in prosecution) and dropped 12 other cases. The Elie Wiesel Institute has also identified several streets named after, and statues erected in honour of, Legionnaires and other Nazi-collaborators who were apologists for antisemitism and convicted of war crimes.

Human rights organization have criticised the governmental approach to Gregorian Bivolaru and his Movement of Spiritual Integration into the Absolute. He was granted political asylum in Sweden. According to the Romanian press agency Agerpres, citing the website of EUROPOL, "Bivolaru is wanted for [...] trafficking in human beings in Finland and France in 2008-2013". A provisional arrest warrant has been issued by the Romanian authorities. Mr. Bivolaru is on the Interpol red notice as of November 2024, at the request of Finland. He has been provisionally arrested in France on 28 November 2023, and he is still under provisional arrest as of November 2024, for crimes under French law.

=== Education ===
By law, religious education in schools is optional. Each of the 18 legally recognised religious denominations is entitled to offer religion classes, based on its own religious teachings, in schools. A denomination may offer classes regardless of the number of students adhering to the denomination in a school. The law allows for exceptions where the right of students to attend religion classes cannot be implemented "for objective reasons," without specifying what these reasons may be.

Under the law, parents of students under 18 years of age are required to request their children’s participation in religion classes, while students 18 and older may themselves ask to attend religion classes. Although a student normally takes a school course based on the religious teachings of the denomination to which the student belongs, it is also possible for a student to take a religion course offered by his or her denomination outside the school system and bring a certificate from the denomination to receive academic credit.

Religion teachers are government employees, but each religious denomination approves the appointment and retention of the teachers of its religion classes.

The law forbids religious proselytising in schools. If teachers proselytise, the school management decides the punishment based on the conclusions of an internal committee.

The percentage of schoolchildren opting to take religion classes remained at almost 90 percent and, according to the media, NGOs, and parents’ associations, continued to be the result of manipulation and pressure by the Romanian Orthodox Church as well as the failure of school directors to offer parents alternatives to the religion classes. Observers reported school inspectorates did not enforce a ministerial order mandating annual submission of requests to take religion classes and instead considered children’s initial requests to be valid for an entire four-year study cycle.

== Societal attitudes ==
Greek Catholic priests say Romanian Orthodox priests harass and intimidate Greek Catholics, especially in rural areas, and to encourage Romanian Orthodox Church members to try to prevent individuals from joining the Greek Catholic Church. There have been similar reports of such behavior by Romanian Orthodox clergy by followers of the Baháʼí Faith (no formal "clergy" exists).

Several religious organizations outside of the Romanian Orthodox Church have reported instances of Romanian Orthodox clergy prohibiting the burial of non-Romanian Orthodox individuals in cemeteries under their control, in contravention of the law.

There have additionally been instances of vandalism against Jewish cemeteries, and antisemitic rhetoric can be found in print and on social media in Romania. Anti-Muslim rhetoric is repeated in the media, categorizing Muslims as "invaders". Anti-Muslim conspiracy theories are common on Romanian social media. In a 2019 survey conducted by the National Anti-Discrimination Council, Romanians expressed high distrust of Muslims, Jews, and other religious minorities. 23 percent of respondents said that they would not be friends with a member of a religious minority, and 60 percent said that they believed that Muslims are dangerous. A separate study conducted by the European Commission reported that 43 percent of Romanians believed that religious discrimination was widespread while 51 percent said it was rare; 77 percent would be comfortable having an elected head of state that was not a member of the country's majority faith.

== See also ==
- Religion in Romania

== Bibliography ==
- Andea, Susana (2005). "The Romanian Principalities in the 17th Century". In Pop, Ioan-Aurel; Bolovan, Ioan (eds.). History of Romania : compendium. Cluj-Napoca: Romanian Cultural Institute. pp. 315–396. ISBN 978-973-7784-12-4.* Barta, Gábor (1994). "The Emergence of the Principality and its First Crises (1526–1606)". In Köpeczi, Béla; Barta, Gábor; Bóna, István; Makkai, László; Szász, Zoltán; Borus, Judit (eds.). History of Transylvania. Budapest: Akadémiai Kiadó. pp. 245–300. ISBN 963-05-6703-2.
- Bolovan, Ioan; Constantiniu, Florin; Michelson, Paul E.; Pop, Ioan Aurel; Popa, Cristian; Popa, Marcel; Scurtu, Ioan; Treptow, Kurt W.; Vultur, Marcela; Watts, Larry L. (1997). A history of Romania (3rd ed.). Iași: Center for Romanian Studies. ISBN 973-98091-0-3.
- Cernovodeanu, Paul "Evreii în epoca fanariotă" ("Jews in the Phanariote Epoch"), in Magazin Istoric, March 1997, p. 25-28
- Fine, John V. A. (1994). The late medieval Balkans : a critical survey from the late twelfth century to the Ottoman Conquest. The University of Michigan Press. ISBN 0-472-08260-4.
- Georgescu, Vlad (1991). The Romanians : a history. Columbus: Ohio State University Press. ISBN 978-0-8142-0511-2.
- Hitchins, Keith (2014). A concise history of Romania. Cambridge University Press. ISBN 978-0-521-87238-6.
- Oișteanu, Andrei ""Evreul imaginar" versus "Evreul real"" (""The Imaginary Jew" Versus "The Real Jew""), in Mythos & Logos, Editura Nemira, Bucharest, 1998, p.175-263
- Ornea, Zigu Anii treizeci. Extrema dreaptă românească ("The 1930s: The Romanian Far Right"), Editura Fundației Culturale Române, Bucharest, 1995
- Pop, Ioan Aurel (1999). Romanians and Romania : a brief history. Boulder: East European Monographs. ISBN 0-88033-440-1.
- Rezachevici, Constantin "Evreii din țările române în evul mediu" ("Jews in the Romanian Lands during the Middle Ages"), in Magazin Istoric: 16th century — September 1995, p. 59-62; 17th and 18th centuries — October 1995, p. 61-66
- Veiga, Francisco (1993) Istoria Gărzii de Fier, 1919–1941: Mistica ultranaționalismului ("The History of the Iron Guard, 1919–1941: The Mistique of Ultra-Nationalism"), Bucharest, Humanitas (Romanian-language version of the 1989 Spanish edition La mística del ultranacionalismo (Historia de la Guardia de Hierro) Rumania, 1919–1941, Bellaterra: Publicacions de la Universitat Autònoma de Barcelona, ISBN 84-7488-497-7)
