= Mircea Grosaru =

Romanian politician and lawyer

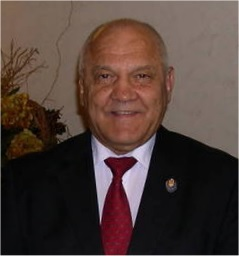
Mircea Grosaru

Mircea Grosaru (June 30, 1952 – February 3, 2014) was a Romanian politician, MP (2000–2014), and lawyer.

Born in Buhuși, he was a 1974 graduate in mathematics and physics from the Pedagogical Institute of Bacău He earned a law degree from the University of Craiova in 2000. According to a member of Romania's Italian community, he attended meetings of its organization, initially identifying as an ethnic Romanian. He later claimed, without evidence, that his wife's grandfather was Italian. When asked about the subject in 2012, he initially dismissed the question as "lacking relevance", and initially hesitated when asked to explain his Italian ancestry. Later, he stated that his grandfather was an Italian, Lorenzo Masseri, who changed his surname into a Romanian one.

Grosaru belonged to the National Liberal Party until 2010. During his time in office, he helped establish a collaboration agreement between the Italian Association of Romania and the European Democratic Party, which is now being continued by his son, Andi-Gabriel Grosaru. However, in 2010, the Suceava County chapter expelled him for inactivity and for voting "against the interests of Romanians and right-wing principles".

Grosaru hired his wife Ioana to work in his parliamentary office, when from 2008 to 2011, she earned 66,745 lei. In 2013, the National Integrity Agency accused him of a conflict of interest. He was found guilty during a first trial, but died before proceedings were finished. In 2015, prosecutors alleged that Grosaru was promised a bribe from businessman Marian Vlasov, in exchange for promoting a law that would be to the latter's benefit. Reportedly, the bribe consisted of an arbiter's post within the Romanian affiliate of the Court of International Commercial Arbitration; Grosaru was named to this post in March 2013.

Grosaru died on February 3, 2014, at the age of 61 from cardiac arrest. The funeral was held at the Romanian Orthodox Mirăuți Church in Suceava. At the 2016 election, his son Andi Gabriel Grosaru was elected to the same seat.
