= Greci, Tulcea =

Greci
- Commune
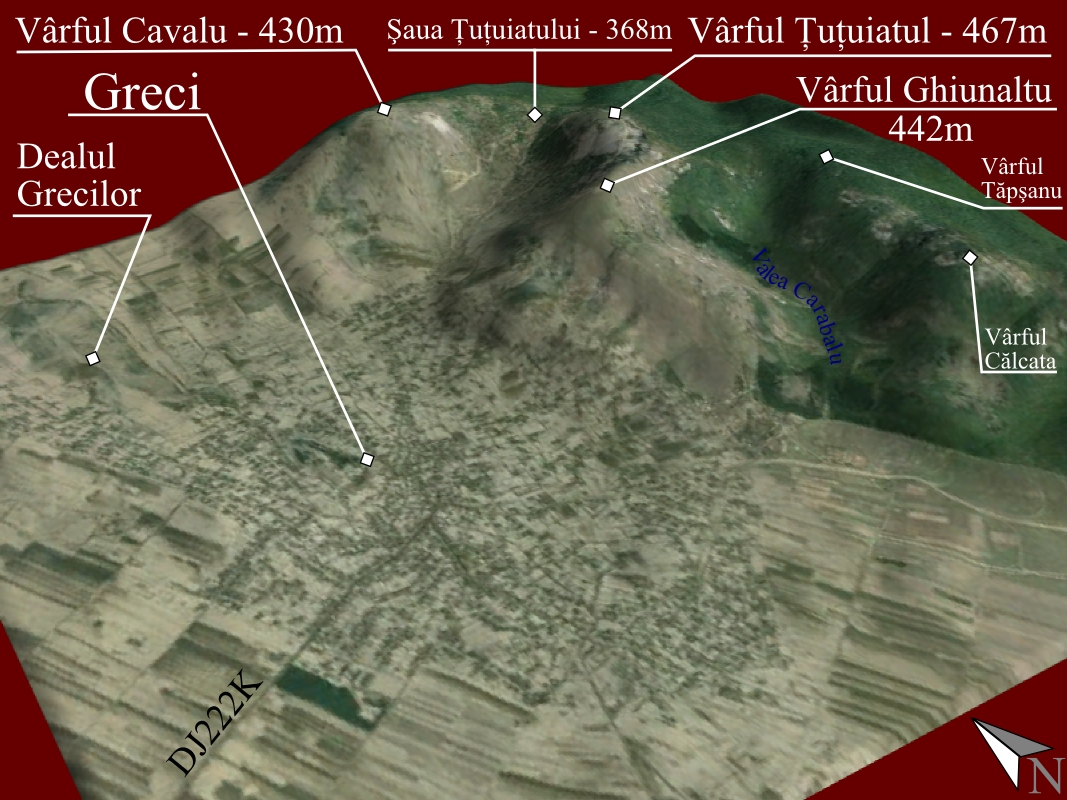

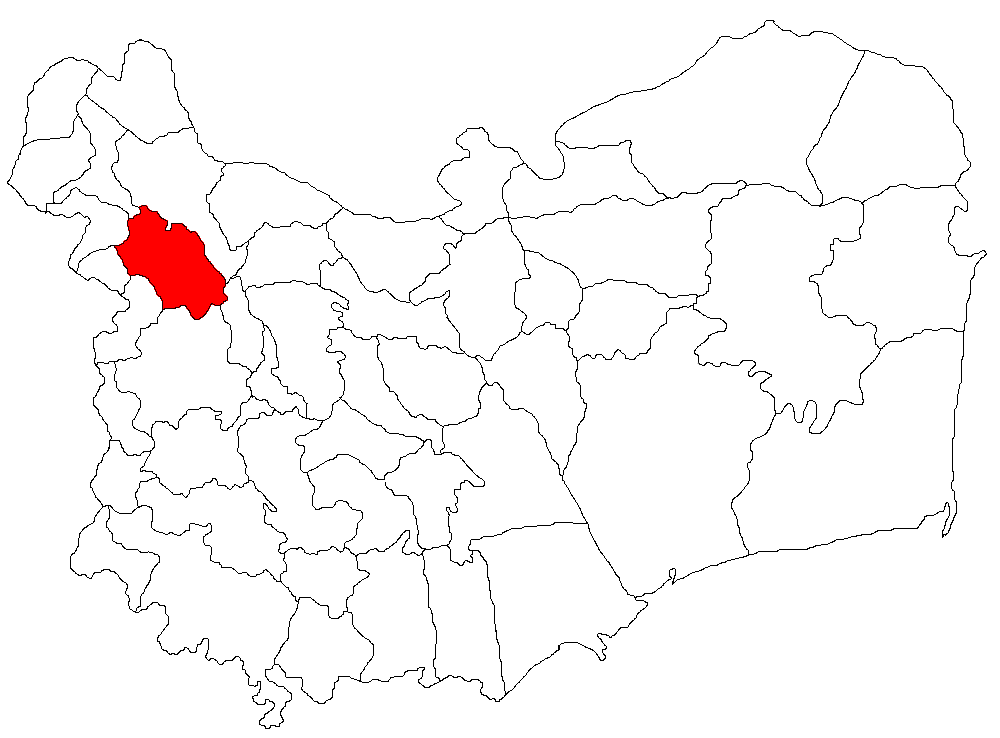
- Location in Tulcea County

- Location in Romania
- Coordinates: 45°11′N 28°14′E
- Country: Romania
- County: Tulcea
- Area: 87.52 km^{2} (33.79 sq mi)
- Population (2021-12-01): 4,692
  - Density: 53.61/km^{2} (138.9/sq mi)
- Time zone: UTC+02:00 (EET)
  - Summer (DST): UTC+03:00 (EEST)
- Vehicle reg.: TL
- Website: www.primaria-greci.ro/ (in Romanian)

Greci is a commune in Tulcea County, Northern Dobruja, Romania. It is composed of a single village, Greci.
