= Valerio Lazzeri =

Swiss Roman Catholic bishop

His Excellency Valerio Lazzeri
- Bishop of Lugano
- Church: Roman Catholic
- Diocese: Diocese of Lugano
- Appointed: 4 November 2013
- Installed: 7 December 2013
- Term ended: 10 October 2022
- Predecessor: Pier Giacomo Grampa

Orders
- Ordination: 2 September 1989
- Consecration: 7 December 2013 by Diego Causero

Personal details
- Born: 22 July 1963 (age 62) Dongio
- Motto: Non impedias musicam (latin)
- Coat of arms

Styles of Valerio Lazzeri
- Reference style: The Most Reverend
- Spoken style: Your Excellency
- Religious style: Bishop
- Posthumous style: not applicable

Valerio Lazzeri (born 22 July 1963) is a Swiss prelate of the Catholic Church who was bishop of Lugano from 2013 to 2022.

== Biography ==
Valerio Lazzeri was born in Dongio on 22 July 1963. He carried out his studies from 1982 to 1987 at the San Carlo diocesan seminary, which was then based in the Salesianum boarding school in Friborg, and at the University of Fribourg, where he obtained a licentiate in theology in 1987. He continued his studies at the Pontifical Lombard Seminary in Rome (1987-1989) and at the Pontifical Gregorian University (1987-1988). On 2 September 1989 he was ordained a priest by the bishop of Lugano Eugenio Corecco in the Lugano Cathedral. In 1991 he obtained his doctorate in theology at the Pontifical theological faculty Teresianum in Rome. From 1991 to 1993 he was vice-rector and teacher in the Collegio Papio in Ascona.

From 1993 to 1999 he worked for the Congregation for Catholic Education in Rome. In 1999 he became a professor of spiritual theology at the Faculty of Theology of Lugano and episcopal vicar of the diocese of Lugano for women religious. From 1999 to 2009 he was a parish collaborator in Locarno, where he dealt in particular with preaching, catechesis and Lectio divina. In 2009 he moved to Bose, Poland, for a year, dedicating himself to study and research, and making a journey of spiritual deepening. Returning to Lugano, he resumed the duties of episcopal vicar and teacher at the Faculty of Theology. In 2010 he became canon of the chapter of the Cathedral of San Lorenzo. He was also appointed spiritual director at the diocesan seminary and assistant to the Ordo Virginum.

Pope Francis named Lazzeri bishop of Lugano in Switzerland on 4 November 2013. He received his episcopal consecration on 7 December from Archbishop Diego Causero, apostolic nuncio to Switzerland.

Pope Francis accepted his resignation on 11 October 2022 without explanation. At a press conference the same day Lazzeri said: "Sincerity and complete transparency compel me to tell you that, especially in the last two years, an inner fatigue has grown in me that has gradually deprived me of the momentum and serenity."
