= Vladimir Petković =

Bosnian football manager (born 1963)

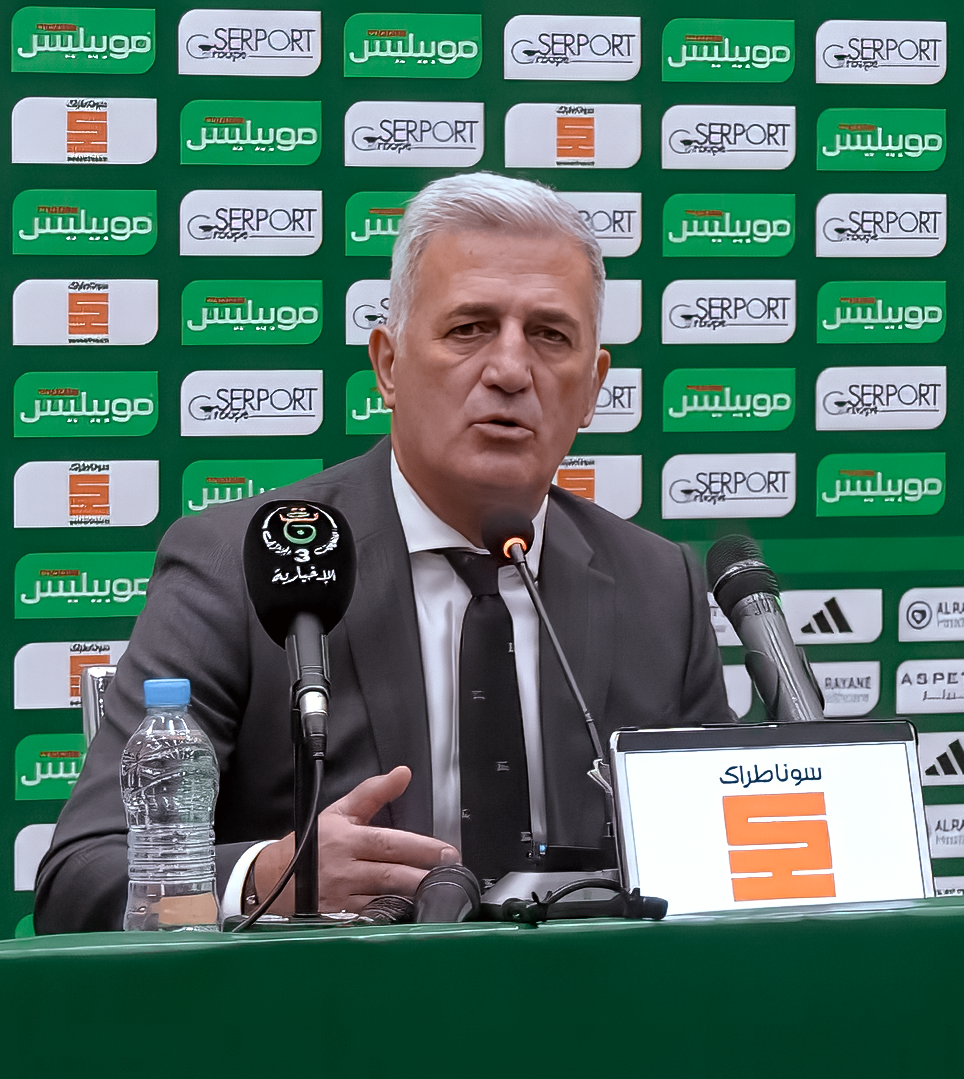
- Petković as Algeria head coach in 2024

Personal information
- Full name: Vladimir Petković
- Date of birth: 15 August 1963 (age 63)
- Place of birth: Sarajevo, SR Bosnia and Herzegovina, SFR Yugoslavia
- Height: 1.90 m (6 ft 3 in)
- Position: Midfielder

Youth career
- –1978: Igman Ilidža
- 1978–1981: Sarajevo

Senior career*
Years	Team	Apps	(Gls)
1981–1984	Sarajevo	8	(0)
1984–1985	Rudar Prijedor	15	(7)
1985	Sarajevo	2	(0)
1985–1986	Koper	14	(4)
1986–1987	Sarajevo	17	(3)
1987–1988	Chur 97		
1988–1989	Sion	6	(0)
1989–1990	Martigny-Sports	31	(8)
1990–1993	Chur 97	87	(19)
1993–1996	Bellinzona	63	(8)
1996–1997	Locarno	32	(3)
1997–1998	Bellinzona		
1998–1999	Buochs		
Total		275	(52)

Managerial career
- 1997–1998: Bellinzona (player-manager)
- 1999–2004: Malcantone Agno
- 2004–2005: Lugano
- 2005–2008: Bellinzona
- 2008–2011: Young Boys
- 2011–2012: Samsunspor
- 2012: Sion
- 2012–2014: Lazio
- 2014–2021: Switzerland
- 2021–2022: Bordeaux
- 2024–2026: Algeria
- * Club domestic league appearances and goals

Vladimir Petković (Croatian pronunciation: [ʋlǎdimiːr pêtkoʋit͡ɕ]; born 15 August 1963) is a Bosnian professional football manager and former player. He last served as the coach of the Algeria national team. He was previously manager of French side Bordeaux, the Switzerland national team, a string of Swiss clubs, Turkish club Samsunspor, and Italian club Lazio.

Petković is from Sarajevo, Bosnia and Herzegovina. He holds Bosnian, Swiss and Croatian passports.

== Early life ==
Petković was born in Sarajevo, SFR Yugoslavia, modern-day Bosnia and Herzegovina, in 1963 to a Bosnian Croat family. He is a naturalized Swiss and holds Bosnian, Swiss and Croatian passports. His parents worked in education and due to the family's frequent moving, Petković changed schools several times. They first lived in Vrelo Bosne and then when he was five years old, in Hadžići near Sarajevo.

== Playing career ==
A midfielder with good technique, Petković started playing football in Ilidža as an eleven-year-old before joining the youth sector of his hometown side FK Sarajevo as a fifteen-year-old.

He remained at FK Sarajevo and began his professional career there in the early 1980s. Petković made only a handful of appearances in a strong Sarajevo side led on the pitch by Bosnian Safet Sušić. Petković was a part of the Sarajevo side that won the 1984–85 Yugoslav First League, but made only two league appearances for them. His time at Sarajevo was interrupted by two brief stints elsewhere: first, a successful time with Rudar Prijedor where Petković showed good scoring ability; and then a less successful season in the Yugoslav Second League with a poor NK Koper side which was relegated after finishing last.

Petković emigrated from Yugoslavia in 1987, leaving FK Sarajevo and moving permanently to Switzerland, where he joined second division club Chur 97. After a season with Chur, Petković moved to the Swiss top division, joining a strong Sion side. Sion achieved a third-place finish in the Nationalliga but Petković left the club at the end of the season after only making six league appearances.

After leaving Sion, Petković moved back into the lower tiers, first joining Martigny-Sports before returning to his first Swiss club, Chur 97. Petković enjoyed a career as a regular goalscoring midfielder in the Swiss second division, which included two more stints at Bellinzona and Lugano.

Petković completed his playing career as a player-manager with Bellinzona and Malcantone Agno, the latter having later merged with financially stricken Lugano.

== Managerial career ==
=== Coaching in Switzerland ===
After his retirement from playing, Petković became a coach and his first job was player-manager at Bellinzona in 1997. In 2004, he took over the reins at Lugano before returning to Bellinzona for the fourth time in his career, where he led the club to the 2008 Swiss Cup final, only to lose out to Basel, and promotion to the Swiss Super League. At the beginning of the 2008–09 season, he was appointed as manager of Young Boys. After taking charge at the club, Petković installed a 3–4–3 formation and took the Bern side to a second-placed league finish. After two more seasons with Young Boys, he was sacked after a 1–1 draw against Luzern on 7 May 2011. The club finished in third place in the league behind their rivals Zürich and Basel.

=== Samsunspor and return to Switzerland ===
In 2011, he became the new manager of Turkish side Samsunspor. He resigned from that position in January 2012 with the club in the relegation zone. On 15 May 2012, he was named the new temporary manager of Sion until the end of the 2011–12 season.

=== Lazio ===
On 2 June 2012, Petković became the new manager of Italian side Lazio in Serie A. He won the Coppa Italia with the club in the 2012–13 season, thanks to a 71st minute goal from compatriot Senad Lulić in the 2013 Coppa Italia Final against Roma.|final]].

=== Switzerland national team ===
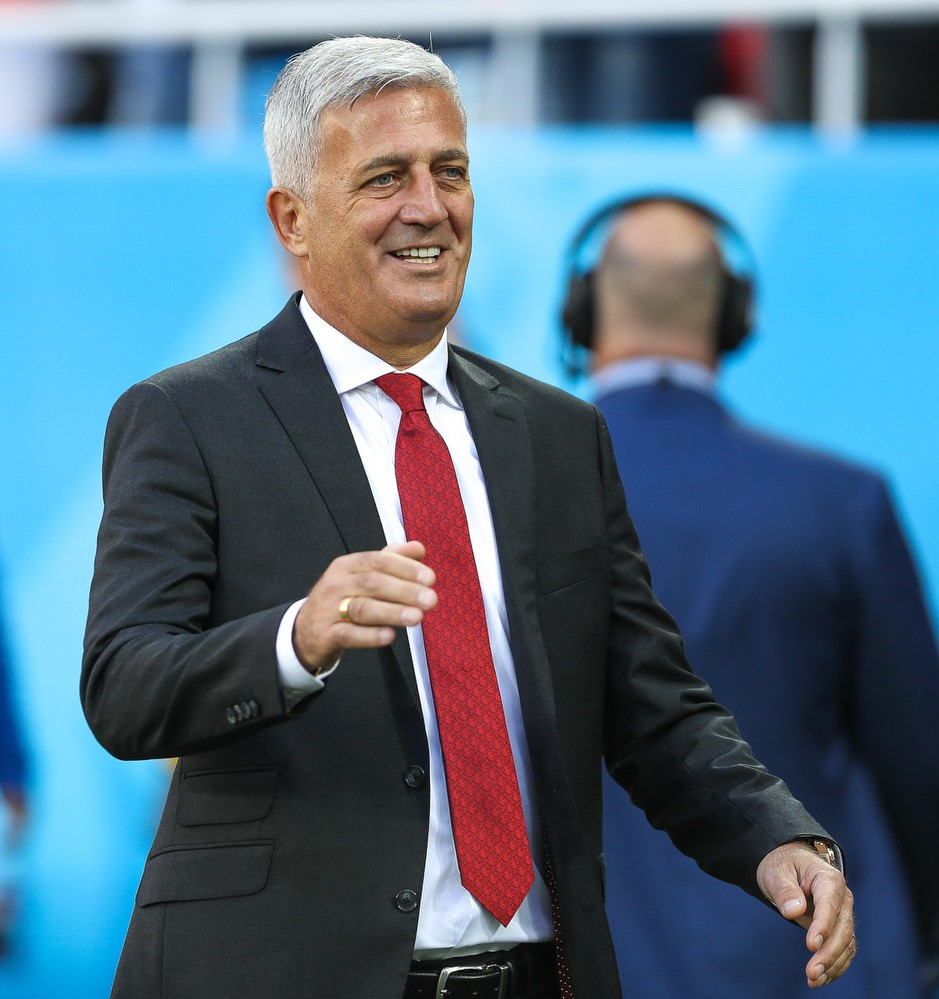
Petković with Switzerland at the 2018 FIFA World Cup

On 23 December 2013, it was announced that Petković was to succeed Ottmar Hitzfeld as the manager of the Switzerland national team after the 2014 FIFA World Cup. As a result, Claudio Lotito fired Petković claiming a breach of the contract due to not having been duly informed by Petković about the latter's ongoing negotiations with the Swiss Football Association. Petković was sacked as Lazio manager on 4 January 2014 and was replaced by Edy Reja, which resulted in a legal dispute concerning the contract termination.

Since his appointment to the national team spot in July 2014, Petković has guided the Swiss to the Round of 16 stages of both the UEFA Euro 2016 and the 2018 FIFA World Cup, along with the quarter-finals of UEFA Euro 2020. They also reached the 2019 UEFA Nations League Finals. At the UEFA Euro 2020, he led Switzerland to defeat world champions France 5–4 on penalties in the Round of 16, after a 3–3 draw, to qualify to the quarter-finals of the European Championship for the first time in their history.

=== Bordeaux ===
In late July 2021, Petković became the manager of French club Bordeaux. In February 2022, he was sacked as the team was struggling in the relegation positions in Ligue 1.

=== Algeria ===
On 29 February 2024, Petković became the head coach of the Algerian national team. Later that year, on 6 June, he lost his first competitive match 2–1 at home against Guinea during the 2026 FIFA World Cup qualification. Four days later, he achieved his first win in a 2–1 victory over Uganda. On 9 October 2025, Algeria qualified for the 2026 World Cup. The Algerian Football Federation sacked him after losing 2–0 to Switzerland in the World Cup round of 32 in which is arguably the worst appearance Algeria has made in the history of World Cup.

== Charitable work ==
While living in Switzerland, Petković worked for Caritas Ticino, a Catholic relief development and social service organisation, for five years.

== Managerial statistics ==
As of match played 2 July 2026

Managerial record by team and tenure
Team	Nat.	From	To	Record					Ref.
Team	Nat.	From	To	G	W	D	L	Win %	Ref.
Bellinzona	(Switzerland)	July 1997	May 1998	30	12	7	11	40.00	
Malcantone Agno	(Switzerland)	1999	2004	166	86	42	38	51.81	
Lugano	(Switzerland)	June 2004	June 2005	36	14	10	12	38.89	
Bellinzona	(Switzerland)	October 2005	June 2008	135	72	28	35	53.33	
Young Boys	(Switzerland)	August 2008	8 May 2011	131	78	21	32	59.54	
Samsunspor	(Turkey)	1 July 2011	27 January 2012	22	4	7	11	18.18	
Sion	(Switzerland)	15 May 2012	1 June 2012	4	1	0	3	25.00	
Lazio	(Italy)	2 June 2012	4 January 2014	81	37	22	22	45.68	
Switzerland	(Switzerland)	1 July 2014	26 July 2021	78	41	18	19	52.56	
Bordeaux	(France)	27 July 2021	12 February 2022	25	5	8	12	20.00	
Algeria	(Algeria)	29 February 2024	8 August 2026	45	30	10	5	66.67	
Career Total				753	377	176	200	50.07	

== Honours ==
=== Player ===
Sarajevo

- Yugoslav First League: 1984–85

=== Manager ===
Malcantone Agno

- 1. Liga: 2002–03

Lazio

- Coppa Italia: 2012–13
