= PREDA Foundation =

Filipino organization

The People's Recovery Empowerment Development Assistance Foundation, commonly referred to as the PREDA Foundation or PREDA, is a charitable organization that was founded in Olongapo City, Philippines in 1974. Its purposes include the promotion and protection of the dignity and the Human Rights of the Filipino people, especially of women and children. The main focus is to assist the sexually exploited and abused children.

== History ==
Father Shay Cullen is a Catholic missionary priest from Dublin, Ireland, a member of the Missionary Society of St. Columban. He helped found the charity in 1974 along with Alex Corpus Hermoso and Merly Ramirez. Since then, Fr. Shay Cullen has been nominated for the Nobel Peace Prize twice.

Preda Foundation and Fr. Shay Cullen were awarded the prestigious Human Rights Award from the City of Weimar, in Germany.

In 2012, the PREDA Foundation spoke out about the case of the 52,000 Amerasians in the Philippines, the children from soldiers of the US Army settlements in the country who did not get legal recognition of their origins from their own government.

== Description ==
The Preda Foundation is licensed and accredited by the Philippine government. The Preda Foundation is dedicated to the protection of children and working for social transformation and a just and corrupt free society. It has worked to prevent children being locked in small, cramped jails without basic rights. Preda has been actively involved in helping victims of the human trafficking and sex slave trade in the Angeles City. Preda has been involved in promoting and defending the Rights of Children and their Defenders. Preda cooperates closely with international legal tribunals Interpol and the UN Commission on Human Rights.

The PREDA Foundation provides rescue, treatment and recovery for sexually and physically abused children. It investigates and prosecutes abusers, to prevent and protect children and youth against child abuse, substance abuse and AIDS. The foundation helps families in being self-reliant, promotes livelihood training and employment with just wages by providing capital, interest free loans, technical assistance to producers and markets through the Fair Trade Movement and the commercial market. The foundation also works with media to develop public awareness and protect children.

=== Preda projects ===
- Childhood For Children: Rescues Children and youth from brothels and domestic abuse. Rescues children from sexual abusive situations in home or in the streets and brothels. It has helped law enforcement agencies in the detection, arrest and criminal prosecution of those involved in these crimes.
- Legal Services: free legal services for children that have been accused of crime. They also provide research and legal assistance in the prosecution of their abusers.
- Rescue Every Child Today (REACT): Responsible for visits to jails and works on the cases of children in conflict with the Law. The REACT project provides a residential center with therapeutic activities, trainings, non-formal education and legal assistance.
- Street Child Education Early Kontact and Outreach (SEEKOUT): Helps street children that are in dire circumstances by providing help through fresh food, clothes, learning and legal assistance.
- Public Education and Preventive Seminars (PEPS): Provides specialized workshops and training seminars for the prevention of child abuse, drug abuse and the HIV-AIDS by using handouts, posters, video showing and direct people participation.
- Special Human Rights Education and Lobbying (SHARE): A project directed to the Barangay communities, college business on child protection and legal procedures in child abuse cases.
- Research, Advocacy, Information and Networking (RAIN): dissemination through articles, pamphlets, newsletters, public speaking engagements, global awareness building in the Philippines and abroad, through media (radio and TV), and working with journalists and broadcasters.
- Indigenous Peoples Assistance Community Training (IMPACT):
  - helping organize Indigenous People's leaders for dialogue and community action for environmental protection and development.
  - establishes tree nurseries and provides a least a thousand (2 meter tall) saplings yearly planted by the Indigenous people and volunteers. There are special scholarships for the youth of the 3 communities participating in the project.
- Youth Organising and Empowerment Training and Theatre training production (AKBAY): Training in social and family values, leadership training and character formation through seminars, workshops, summer camps, and social projects done by the youth.
- Scholarship for Youth (SCHOLAR): Providing specialised education in nursing assistance, social work, and computer training for disadvantaged youth. The Computer training course is conducted at the Preda computer laboratory with 20 units. The course is certified by TESDA and Microsoft through the LEARN Foundation.
- Internet Safety Campaign (INSEC): National and International safety advocacy campaigns for Internet safety.
- Fair Trading: This is a nationwide project assisting 26 village and urban based production groups making quality handicraft items that are exported by Preda. The project practices the Fair trade criteria and gives interest free production loans, development loans and access to export markets. Village infrastructure projects (clean water systems, land purchase) product design and other family services are provided.
- Tetra Bag Project: The Preda recycling project turned the hundreds of thousands of throwaway aluminum foil pouches into raw material for lucrative livelihood projects for abandoned mothers, survivors of sexual exploitation, youth rescued from prisons, students, and dozens of waste paper collectors and out of work sewers.

== Fil-American children ==
Preda has been highly active in the cause of helping Fil-American Children. Preda Social workers organized the association of 720 mother of Fil-American children, provided family research assistance and helping to pursue a class action suit in the US court of complaints in Washington, D.C., on behalf of the children in 1993. Preda visited and lobbied the US congress and State Department and succeeded in advancing a US congressional resolution assigning $650,000 for the FilAm children through US AID and other agencies.

== Campaign against pedophiles and human trafficking ==
Preda has been highly active in the Philippines in a campaign against pedophiles and human trafficking. The Preda Human Rights team lobbied successfully for the passing of the Olongapo City Anti-Prostitution Ordinance No. 51. In March, 2008, Preda organized a march from the Olongapo City hall with banners and placards to the gate of the former United States Military base and held a rally calling for the implementation of the law and for the city government to cancel permits given to sex bars and clubs. This was a historic first. Never was there such a public protest allowed on the streets before. Preda have been actively involved in the fight against the child sex slavery trade in the notorious pedophile haunt of Angeles. Working undercover with law enforcement agencies and volunteers, with the help of hidden cameras, they have uncovered bars trafficking children for prostitution in Angeles.

== Threats and harassment against PREDA staff ==
PREDA staffers receive threats from pedophiles and their sympathizers in the sex tourist industry. The staff are continually harassed with false charges and smear campaigns to prevent them pursuing justice for victims of sexual abuse. As a result, PREDA works for the implementation of the UN Declaration of 1998 protecting the defenders of human rights against such abuse. When Father Shay Cullen exposed a child prostitution ring in Subic Bay he was threatened with deportation.

== Awards and nominations ==
- Nobel Peace Prize Nomination: On October 3, 2002, Canadian MP Hon. David Kilgour of Edmonton Southeast nominated Fr. Shay for the Award.
- Nobel Nomination 2003: Christa Nickels, German MP nominated Fr. Shay for the 2003 Nobel Peace Prize.
- In 2003, Fr. Shay was awarded the first Prix Caritas by Caritas Switzerland. Awarded to Preda in honour of its initiatives and extraordinary engagement for children in need.
- A film about children's rights campaigner, Fr Shay Cullen has been won the Radharc Award 2004. Entitled 'Fr Shay Cullen: Taking a Stand' and produced by Annette Kinne Andec Communications, the documentary was filmed on location in the Philippines, Germany, Britain and Ireland.
- BETINHO PRIZE. Preda was shortlisted for the 2000 Association for Progressive Communications (APC) Betinho Communications Prize because of their website preda.org and the use of the internet for human rights campaign.
- On September 13, 2008, FR. Shay Cullen and PREDA was awarded the International Person Of The Year Award in Dublin, Ireland.
- On October 9, 2008, Fr. Shay Cullen was awarded the International Solidarity Prize by the Prestigious World Medical Child Care Associations.
- Fr. Shay Cullen was honoured with the Humanitarian Award at the 2009 Meteor Ireland Music Awards.
