= Texaid =

Texaid-Textilverwertungs-AG (TEXAID) is a commercial company for the recycling of used clothing, 50% of which is owned by the German Böschen family, 50% by a consortium of the Swiss Red Cross, Winterhilfe Schweiz, Solidar Suisse, Caritas Switzerland, Kolping Schweiz and the Swiss Protestant Church Aid Organisation (HEKS). Based in Schattdorf (canton of Uri), Switzerland, the company is one of the largest organisations in Europe for the collection, sorting and recycling of used textiles.

== History ==
Texaid was founded in 1978 as an association of six Swiss relief organizations. These are the Swiss Red Cross, Winterhilfe Schweiz, Solidar Suisse (formerly Schweizerisches Arbeiterhilfswerk), Caritas Switzerland, Kolping Schweiz and Hilfswerk der Evangelischen Kirchen Schweiz (HEKS). The "Texaid Textilverwertungs-Aktiengesellschaft" was set up together with the Böschen family from Darmstadt to collect, sort and market worn textiles.

In 2005, Texaid Bulgaria Ltd. was founded as a subsidiary in Kostinbrod, Bulgaria. This was followed in 2008 by Texaid Hungaria with headquarters in Bélapátfalva.

Texaid Deutschland GmbH was founded in 2009, Texaid Collection GmbH in Germany was established in 2012 and Resales GmbH, based in Apolda, Thuringia, was acquired in September 2013.

The sorting plant in the free trade zone of Tangier has belonged to Texaid since the takeover of Resales GmbH in 2013. Around 150 employees sort over 8000 tonnes of used textiles annually in the plant.

On December 2, 2016, "PACKMEE - the clothing donation in a carton" was launched on the German market. The German Red Cross is a partner and receives 50 percent of the revenue less postage and logistics costs. Other partners are the logistics companies DHL and Hermes as well as the textile company Esprit. With the system, clothing, shoes and household textiles can be donated free of charge by post.

In 2016, the company entered the Austrian market with its subsidiary TEXAID Austria GmbH through the acquisition of AustriaTex Textile SEVH GmbH.

The classic type of street collection of old clothes is discontinued in most regions of Switzerland: Now, garment bags can be deposited directly in your own mailbox for a specific period. Thanks to the synergies with Swiss Post, there are no empty journeys as the collection of old clothes is combined with the delivery of Swiss Post.

In 2019, the Swiss daily newspaper Blick criticised Texaid for giving the impression of being a charitable organisation, when in reality it was making profits that benefited an unknown portion of the entrepreneurial family: "SonntagsBlick does not in any way assume that laws are being broken here. However, the gap between the entirely humanitarian image of donating old clothes and the capitalist reality is striking."

In 2022, Caritas Switzerland, HEKS, Kolping Switzerland and Winterhilfe Switzerland decided to sell their shares in Texaid to the other shareholders. However, the cooperation is to continue until 2026 so that the aid organisations can 'continue to participate in Texaid's success'.

== Company ==
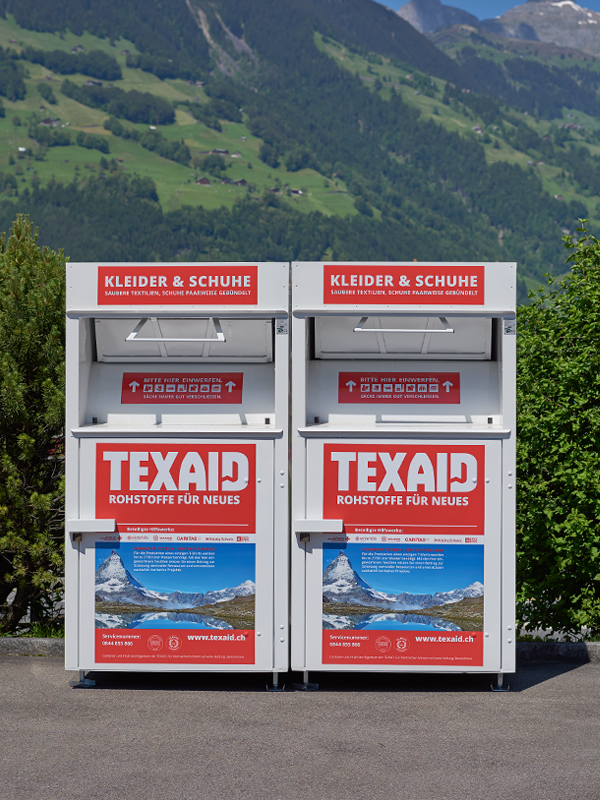
TEXAID worn clothes in Schattdorf (Switzerland)

Texaid operates a network of over 6000 collection containers in Switzerland. In addition, Texaid carries out nationwide street collections every year, among other things in cooperation with Swiss Post. In total, Texaid collects over 35,000 tonnes of old textiles in Switzerland every year and is the market leader.

In Germany, Texaid operates 35 of its own second-hand shops (ReSales) with 532 employees and the second largest sorting plant in Germany, generating sales of 40 million euros in 2015. The Darmstadt-based subsidiary carou GmbH also operates several second-hand online shops.

With its Swiss parent company and other locations in Germany, Austria, Bulgaria, Hungary and Morocco, Texaid is one of the largest organisations for the collection, sorting and recycling of used textiles in Europe. Subsidiaries of Texaid Textilverwertungs AG, Schattdorf:

- Texaid Bulgaria Ltd., Kostinbrod, Bulgarien
- Texaid Ungarn, Bélapátfalva
- Texaid Austria GmbH, Linz,
- Texaid Beteiligungsverwaltung Deutschland GmbH, Darmstadt
- Texaid Collection GmbH, Apolda,
- Deutschland Vertrieb Textilhandels- und -recycling GmbH, Apolda
- ReSales Immobilien- und Beteiligungsverwaltung GmbH, Apolda
