= Bosatta =

Bosatta is an Italian surname. Notable people with the surname include:

- Dina Bosatta (1858–1887), Italian Roman Catholic professed nun
- Renato Bosatta (born 1938), Italian rower
