= Pier Giacomo Grampa =

Swiss-Italian Roman Catholic bishop (born 1936)

His Excellency, The Most Reverend Pier Giacomo Grampa
- Bishop Emeritus of Lugano
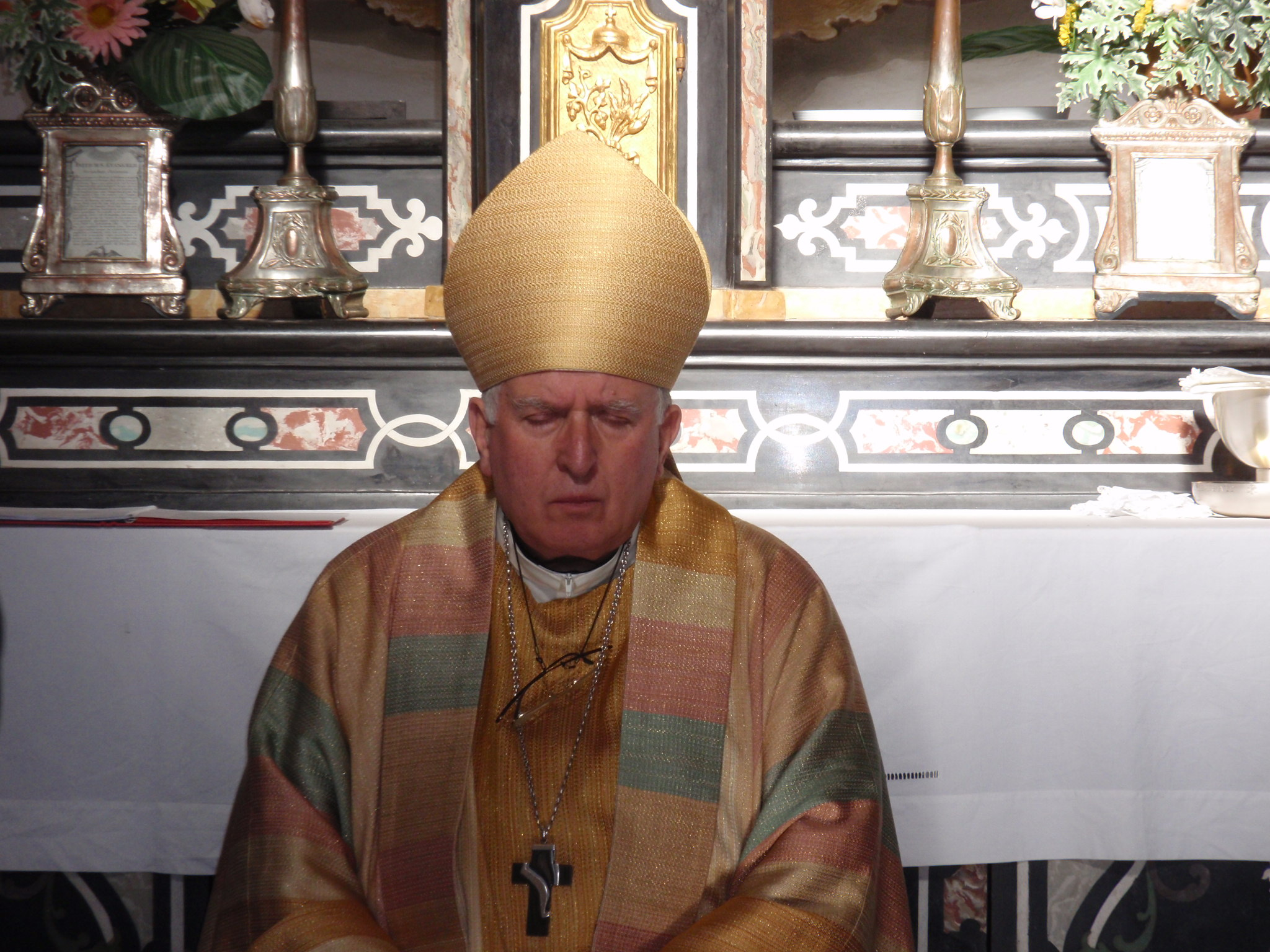
- Church: Roman Catholic Church
- Diocese: Lugano
- Appointed: 18 December 2003
- Term ended: 4 November 2013
- Predecessor: Giuseppe Torti
- Successor: Valerio Lazzeri

Orders
- Ordination: 6 December 1959
- Consecration: 25 January 2004

Personal details
- Born: 28 October 1936 (age 89) Busto Arsizio, Italy
- Coat of arms

Pier Giacomo Grampa (born 28 October 1936) is a Swiss‑Italian prelate of the Roman Catholic Church who served as the bishop of the Diocese of Lugano in Switzerland from 2003 until his retirement in 2013. Upon retiring, he became bishop emeritus of Lugano.

== Early life and education ==
Pier Giacomo Grampa was born on 28 October 1936 in Busto Arsizio, in the Province of Varese in northern Italy. He studied philosophy and theology at the seminaries of Venegono Inferiore and Lugano, and completed advanced theological studies at the Faculty of Theology in University of Innsbruck, earning a licentiate in theology.

Grampa was ordained to the priesthood on 6 December 1959 in Lugano. Following ordination, he taught Latin and Italian at the minor seminary and served as vice‑rector and later rector of the Collegio Papio in Ascona while also serving in various parish roles.

== Episcopal ministry ==
On 18 December 2003, Grampa was appointed by Pope John Paul II as the bishop of the Diocese of Lugano. He received his episcopal consecration on 25 January 2004 in the Cathedral of San Lorenzo in Lugano. In addition to his diocesan service, he was appointed Grand Prior of the Swiss Lieutenancy of the Equestrian Order of the Holy Sepulchre of Jerusalem in 2007.

Grampa served as bishop of Lugano for nearly a decade, focusing on pastoral care, theological dialogue, and diocesan initiatives. He retired on 4 November 2013 upon reaching the canonical age for retirement, becoming bishop emeritus.

== Later life ==
Following his retirement, Grampa continued to be active in church life, participating in confirmations, conferences, writings, and pastoral work. He has also published books on faith and pastoral reflection.

== Publications ==
Several works by Grampa have been published, including collections of his theological writings and reflections on faith, Church life, and the Second Vatican Council.
