= Servants of Charity =

Catholic clerical congregation

Congregation of the Servants of Charity
- Congregatio Servorum a Charitate (Latin)
- Abbreviation: Post-nominal letters: S.C.
- Nickname: Guanellian
- Formation: 1908; 118 years ago
- Founder: Saint Fr. Luigi Guanella
- Founded at: Como, Lombardy, Italy
- Type: Clerical Religious Congregation of Pontifical Right (for Men)
- Headquarters: General Motherhouse; Vicolo Clemente 41, 00148 Rome, Italy
- Coordinates: 41°54′4.9″N 12°27′38.2″E
- Region served: Europe and the Americas
- Members: 558 members (366 priests) as of 2018
- Motto: Latin: In Omnibus Charitas; English: In all things Love
- Superior General: Fr. Umberto Brugnoni, S.C.
- Patron saints: Blessed Virgin Mary (under the title Madonna Della Strada)
- Apostolate: Education of the poor
- Affiliations: Roman Catholic Church
- Website: http://www.servantsofcharity.org/

The Servants of Charity (Latin: Congregatio Servorum a Charitate) is a Catholic clerical religious congregation of Pontifical Right for men. Members of this clerical congregation are popularly known as 'Guanelliani' (or Guanellians, in English). They add the nominal letters SC after their names to indicate their membership in the Congregation.

== History ==
The institute was founded in Como on March 24, 1908 by Italian priest Luigi Guanella, (1842 - 1915), a friend of David Albertario and Giuseppe Toniolo. He was sensitive to issues of social outcasts and the handicapped. This gave birth to a religious community to provide the needs of the poor. Their motto reads "In Omnibus Charitas" (In all things Love).

The congregation obtained the recognition of ecclesiastical institution of pontifical right with decree of praise, 1912 and was again approved in 1928.

There is also the female branch of Daughters of Saint Mary of Providence.

== Activities and dissemination ==
These religious operate day and evening schools for workers, institutes for the education of youth and speakers. They also run facilities worldwide for the care of persons with intellectual and developmental disabilities.

As of December 31, 2018, the congregation had 103 houses and 558 religious, 366 of them priests.

== Related Items ==
- Saint Luigi Guanella
- Venerable Aurelio Bacciarini
- Blessed Clare Bosatta
