= Eugenio Corecco =

Catholic priest (1931–1995)

- Bishop of Lugano
- Church: Catholic Church
- Diocese: Diocese of Lugano
- In office: 5 June 1986 – 1 March 1995
- Predecessor: Ernesto Togni
- Successor: Giuseppe Torti

Orders
- Ordination: 2 October 1955 by Angelo Giuseppe Jelmini
- Consecration: 29 June 1986 by Henri Schwery

Personal details
- Born: 3 October 1931 Airolo, Switzerland
- Died: 1 March 1995 (aged 63) Lugano, Switzerland

Eugenio Corecco (3 October 1931 – 1 March 1995) was a Swiss bishop of the diocese of Lugano. He was a notable 20th-century canonist who wrote about the theology of canon law.

== Biography ==
Son of Peter, born in Bodio and Margaret Beffa of Airolo, he was ordained priest on October 2, 1955, studied in Rome, at the Pontifical Gregorian University to Munich, where he received his PhD in canon law and Fribourg, where in 1969 was appointed professor of canon law.

In 1982, shortly before the publication of the new Code of Canon Law (CIC), exhibited his critical comments to John Paul II, the Pope called him to Rome to be part of a committee that assists him in the examination of the code, prior to its promulgation. Appointed consultant to the committee on the interpretation of CIC, Eugenio Corecco holds conferences around the world.

Active in the pastoral, from the years 1960–1970 he worked in Switzerland for the spread of the ecclesial movement of Communion and Liberation. The pope John Paul II on June 5, 1986, made him Bishop of Diocese of Lugano and he was consecrated in Lugano Cathedral on June 29 by bishop Henri Schwery, bishop of the Diocese of Sion, with concelebrating bishops Pierre Mamie and Ernesto Togni.

The April 29, 1992, he founded in Lugano the Institute Academic theology which. in the following year, precisely on November 20, 1993, was elevated by the Holy See to the status of a university faculty of theology – Faculty of Theology of Lugano (FTL), giving an opportunity to build in the city of Lugano, USI (University of Italian Switzerland). However, the FTL did not join USI, choosing instead to remain autonomous.

He died on March 1, 1995, as a result of a rare form of cancer, and was buried in the crypt of Church of the Sacred Heart in Lugano.

== Thought ==
=== About charity ===
"Whatever should be the nature of the industry and its interventions in the social field, Caritas is called, with ever greater urgency, to express in society two specific values of Christianity, whose social significance can not be measured purely rational. The first is the gratuity to the man in trouble, because it was free also the redemption offered to us by Christ. The second is to oversupply, excess is the love of Christ for us. The charity has so far as the needs of others, but the richness of God's love limiting it to look and evaluate it from man's need, because man is more than its needs".

=== About canon law ===
"...all the laws of the Church and finally appear first of all as an expression of faith of the People of God, and not only of reason abstractly understood." (Eugenio Corecco, Pamplona 1976. In "Siate forti nella fede", AA.VV., p. 347ss.)

== See also ==
- Caritas Ticino
