= Shay Cullen =

Irish Roman Catholic priest

The Reverend Shay Cullen S.S.C.M.E.
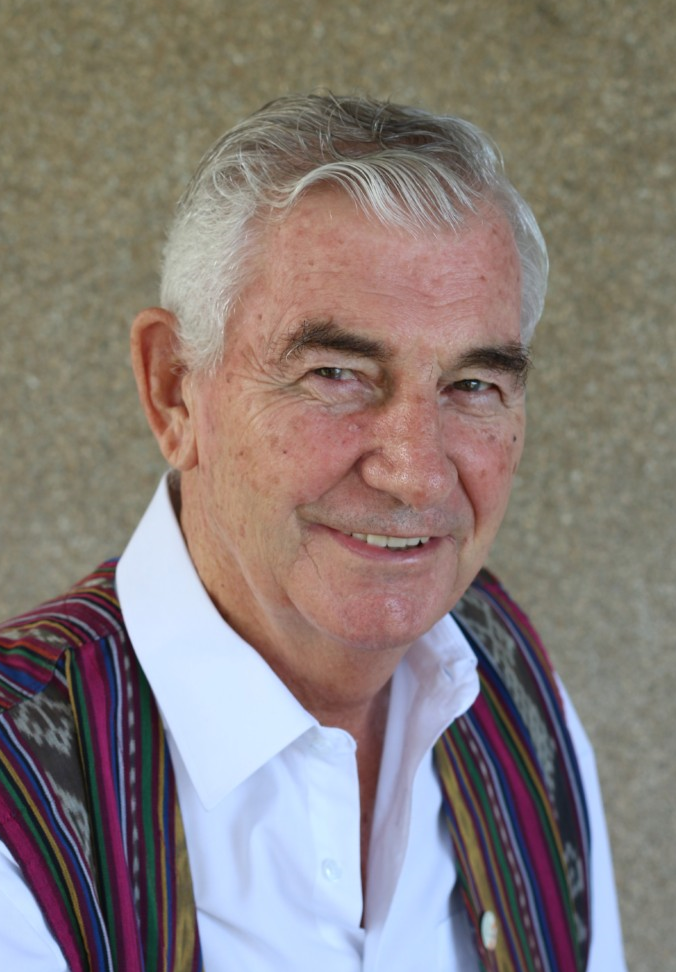
- Church: Roman Catholic Church

Orders
- Ordination: April 1969

Personal details
- Born: March 27, 1943 (age 83) Dublin, Ireland
- Occupation: Missionary Priest

Shay Cullen, SSCME (born 27 March 1943) is an Irish Catholic missionary priest and the founder of the PREDA Foundation. He is a member of the Columbans, an Irish order founded in honour of and named after Saint Columbanus.

He was educated near his home at Harold's Boys by the Presentation Brothers in Glasthule, and CBC Monkstown Park. He helped found PREDA in 1974 along with Alex Corpus Hermoso and Merly Ramirez. This small non-profit organisation has a number of purposes, including the promotion and protection of the human rights of the Filipino people, especially women and children. During the Ferdinand Marcos dictatorship, activists and dissidents were arrested and jailed. Cullen was one of three priests arrested on September 23, 1972, upon the declaration of martial law in the Philippines.

The Preda Foundation and Cullen were awarded the Human Rights Award from the City of Weimar in 2000 and received the Prix Caritas from Caritas Switzerland in 2003. PREDA cooperates closely with international legal tribunals, Interpol and the UN Commission on Human Rights. In 2017, Cullen was awarded with the Martin Buber Plaque at the Euriade, the international festival for dialogue.
