= Aurelio Bacciarini =

Venerable Aurelio Bacciarini SdC
- Apostolic Administrator of Lugano
- Church: Roman Catholic Church
- Diocese: Lugano
- See: Lugano
- Appointed: 12 January 1917
- Term ended: 27 June 1935
- Predecessor: Alfredo Peri-Morosini
- Successor: Angelo Giuseppe Jelmini
- Other post: Titular Bishop of Daulia (1917-1935)
- Previous posts: Superior General of Servants of Charity (1915-1924); President of the Swiss Episcopal Conference (1932-1933)

Orders
- Ordination: 12 June 1897
- Consecration: 21 January 1917 by Basilio Pompili
- Rank: Bishop

Personal details
- Born: Aurelio Bacciarini; 8 November 1873 Lavertezzo, Ticino, Switzerland
- Died: 27 June 1935 (aged 61) Lugano, Ticino, Switzerland
- Motto: In omnibus caritas ("Charity in all things")

Aurelio Bacciarini (8 November 1873 – 27 June 1935) was a Swiss religious priest of the Servants of Charity who served as the interim administrator of the Diocese of Lugano. He was also the founder of the Secular Institute of the Company of Saint Therese of the Child Jesus. He became known in his diocese as the "Apostle of the Sacred Heart".

He was proclaimed to be venerable in 2008 after Pope Benedict XVI recognized that Bacciarini had lived a life of heroic virtue. A miracle attributed to his intercession is under investigation.

== Early life ==
Aurelio Bacciarini was born in Ticino in Switzerland on 8 November 1873 to Lodovico and Maria Sciarini as the seventh of eight children; one older sister was Filomena. He was baptized on 9 November under the Provost Pietro Vaghetti. The eighth child, a sister, died in 1875 soon after birth and his father died on 6 September 1876.

== Priesthood ==
He went to Vaghetti for support in following his vocation and he soon commenced his theological studies in Milan. He was ordained to the priesthood on 12 June 1897 in Rome in the church of Santa Maria degli Angeli e dei Martiri. Bacciarini served as a spiritual director from 1903 to 1906. On 8 October 1906 in Como he entered the congregation of the Servants of Charity and ascended to the post of its superior general in 1915. The beginning of 1917 saw Pope Benedict XV appoint him as the Apostolic Administrator of the Diocese of Lugano and Bacciarini receive the episcopal consecration a week later in Rome under Cardinal Basilio Pompili. Bacciarini was consecrated as the Titular Bishop of Daulia. Bacciarini was committed to the reorganization of Catholic Action as well as the promotion of crucifixes in public spaces.

His program for his diocese was thus to renew religious life in families and to educate children in the faith

Bacciarini established several diocesan institutions that included a newspaper Giornale del Popolo in 1926 and a religious congregation at the same time.

Bacciarini died on 27 June 1935 in Lugano. He was buried in the Shrine of the Sacred Heart.

== Beatification process ==
The beatification process commenced in Lugano in 1946 under Pope Pius XII in a process that spanned until 25 March 1964. This occurred despite the fact that the formal introduction of the cause was not until 15 December 1981 under Pope John Paul II; it was this introduction that conferred upon him the title of a Servant of God. The local process was ratified in 1982 and culminated with the creation of the Positio. It was sent to the Congregation for the Causes of Saints in Rome in 1997 for further evaluation. On 15 March 2008 he was declared to be venerable after Pope Benedict XVI recognized that Bacciarini had lived a life of heroic virtue. A miracle attributed to Bacciarini's intercession was investigated and the process received the formal decree of ratification in 2007.
