= Jesús Abad Colorado =

Colombian photojournalist (born 1967)

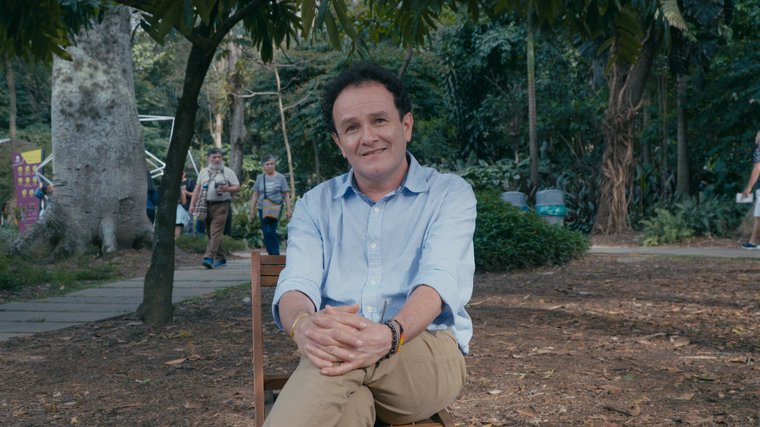
- Abad Colorado in 2019
- Born: 1967 (age 58–59); Medellín, Antioquia, Colombia
- Education: University of Antioquia (B.A.)
- Occupation: Photojournalist
- Awards: CPJ International Press Freedom Award (2006) Caritas Award (2006) Simone Bolivar prize (2000)(2001)(2003)

Jesús Abad Colorado (born 1967) is a Colombian photojournalist. His work focuses on human rights and armed conflict.

He was born in 1967 in Medellín, Colombia. He received a BA in communications from the University of Antioquia. He worked as a photographer for the Medellín newspaper El Colombiano from 1992 to 2001. His work has been shown in more than 30 exhibits, and has been shown internationally. He is co-author of two books, Relatos e Imágenes: El desplazamiento Forzado en Colombia (Narratives and Images: Forced Internal Displacement in Colombia) and Desde la prisión, realidades de las cárceles en Colombia (From the Prison, Realities of the jails in Colombia), and has collaborated on many other books on the subject of human rights.

In 2000, he was kidnapped at a roadblock by National Liberation Army guerrillas and held for two days.

His work has been recognized with numerous awards. He won the Simón Bolivar Prize for Journalism three times. In 2006, he was awarded the Prix Caritas from Caritas Switzerland and the CPJ International Press Freedom Award from the Committee to Protect Journalists. The committee to Protect Journalists had never before given this award to a photojournalist. In 2009, he was on the shortlist for the Prix Pictet.

== Early life ==
Jesús Abdad Colorado had an abnormal childhood. Colorado was not like most children due to being exposed to wartime conditions in the country of Colombia. Colorado came from a family of Antioquian farmers; his life quickly shifted after his grandfather and uncle were executed during the turmoil that took place during the Colombian conflict. This tragedy sparked his empathetic nature, causing him not to seek revenge on the killers of his family but yet to tell the story of his relatives.

The Colombian Conflict is what caused Colorado to pick up a camera. He knew there were stories to be told, but his fears about writing kept him from becoming a journalist. However, he knew he could capture the true essence of everyday people through pain, equality and human rights. "War is represented by the media in a banal way that turns human life into statistics. What I do is take pictures, facing people, looking into their eyes, to give a name to those who I saw crying many times, but also to those who I saw pick themselves up again, always respecting their humanity", Colorado said.

== Career ==
Throughout his 25-year career in photography, Colorado has accumulated experience and numerous awards within the field. Colorado began his career working as a photojournalist for the leading newspaper in Medellín, Colombia, El Colombiano. He started his work there from 1992 through 2001. During this time, Colorado began making a name for himself with his photographs. In 1997 Colorado co-wrote Relatos e Imágenes: El desplazamiento Forzado en Colombia. Colorado then went on to publish his own book, Contra El Olvido, which is a collection of Colombian conflict photography in 1998. Colorado has claimed the Simone Bolivar prize three times (2000, 2001, and 2003). The award is given to someone who has proven themselves as a Latin American "hero." Between 2003 and 2005, Colorado displayed his works in his exhibition Memoria la Guerra Olvidada en Colombia (Memory: The Forgotten War in Colombia). The exhibit ended up being displayed in the Swiss Parliament, in other places, including the United Nations in Geneva. In 2006, he was awarded with the Caritas in Switzerland for advocating for social justice through his images and he was the very first photojournalist in history to receive the International Press Freedom Award from The committee to Protect Journalists (CPJ). In 2009, Colorado went on to co-author another book, Desde la prisión, realidades de las cárceles en Colombia (From the Prison, Realities of the jails in Colombia). His latest exhibit, "El Testigo," opened on 20 October 2019, and displayed 557 images of Colorado's that recorded 25 years of armed conflict in Colombia. The original duration of the exhibit(3 months), was extended to a year due to the 280,000 people who had already visited it in Colombia's capital, Bogotá. The collection is quoted as being"the exhibition that has had the greatest impact on Bogotá's society."

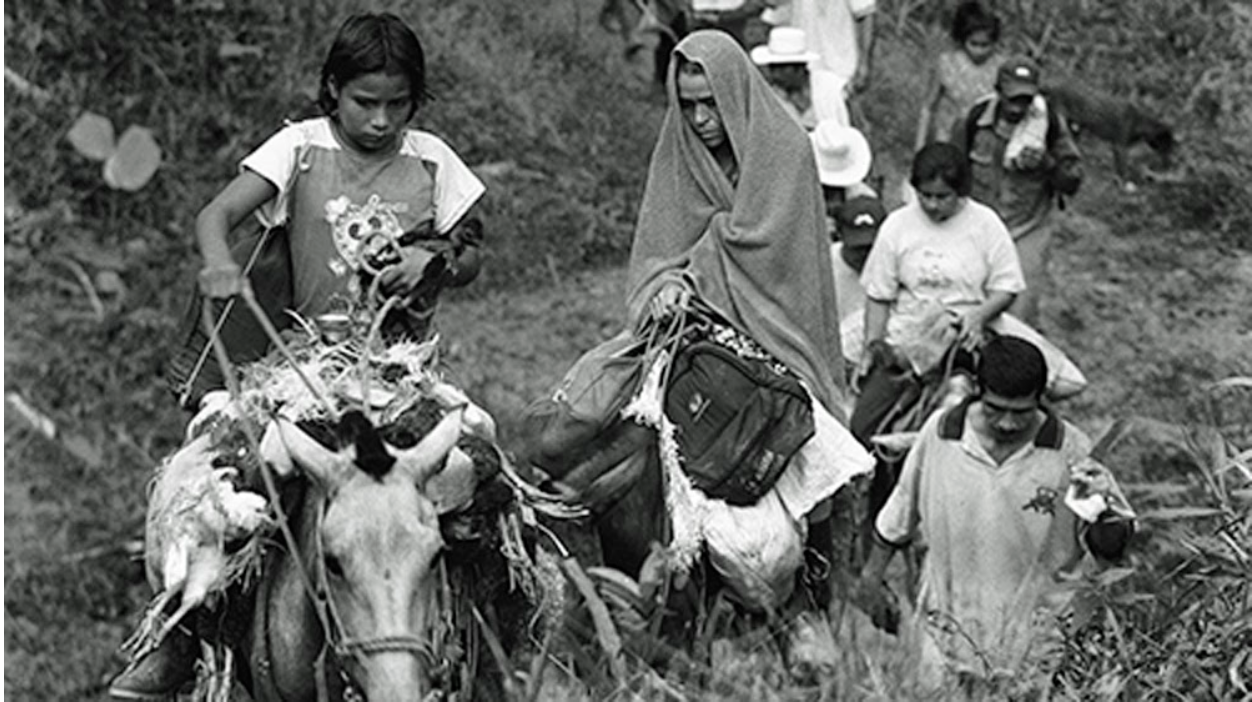

== Politics ==
Jesús Abad Colorado's photography career took off when he landed his first job as a photographer for the Medellían newspaper in 1992. The primary things that Colorado focuses on are human rights and armed conflict. Colorado grew up in the town of San Carlos, Antioquia. The city deemed the name 'the violence' because of all the political conflict taking place there. The town was divided into two sections—conservative and liberal. His family were liberals living in a traditional town. Before Colorado was born, his grandparents were murdered in the midst of this horrific war. All of this conflict was sparked by the RAFC, the Revolutionary Armed Forces of Colombia. The RAFC is Colombia's largest rebel group, who had a crucial role in the war that has consumed Colombia over the past twenty-plus years. This war is what inspired Colorado to start taking photos in South America. Although he was in the middle of a political war, Colorado never chose sides regarding his stance on politics; all he did was capture the horror of the war. More so than not, Colorado was often the only photojournalist that would visit the sites of massacres. He didn't want to capture the reason for the conflict, but rather what came after. What made his photography so powerful and moving is that he would capture the raw emotion of those who suffered losses from the RAFC. Colorado never promoted the idea of this war and never captured any photos of the generals or captains, only the lower-ranking rebels and civilians. The innocent civilians affected by the war were his primary targets. Colorado did this to shed light and bring attention to such a dark time in society.

== Prominent life events ==
On 4 October 2019, Colorado received the Life Long Achievement Award, the Gabo Award. The Gabo Award was awarded to Colorado for exemplifying photojournalism excellence. He received the award in his hometown. Colorado understands the importance of equality and a sense of dignity for all victims. Colorado didn't accept his prize alone. Four of his subjects, in his famous photographs, were invited to attend the ceremony with him. Colorado paid for the attendees to be there. "I understand journalism as memory, not the record of a single day. I see it as building the larger narrative of a country," Colorado said.

== Personal life ==
Jesús Abad Colorado was born in Medellín, Colombia, in 1967 after his parents fled from San Carlos, Antioquia, after his uncle and grandfather were killed due to the political turmoil. The conflict in Colombia occurred due to attacks based on the partisanship within the nation. Attacks on liberal citizens were brutal, and Colorado's parents were one of few in an extremely conservative area. The Colorado family arrived in Medellín with very little to their name. Jesus had seven siblings, including a foster sister. Colorado's father began working as a builder for The National University of Colombia in 1961; his mother had previously been a school teacher in San Carlos. Colorado began joining his father at work every day and learned to read by studying graffiti and political protest messaging. Jesus's father died in 2018, and Colorado credits him as an integral part of his success and inspiration. Being an advocate for the abolition of political violence in Colombia brought him enemies as well as recognition. He has been kidnapped twice by leftist guerrillas; Once in October 2000, guerrillas of the National Liberation Army abducted Colorado at a roadblock and kept him captive for two days. Dedicated to his work and advocating for social justice, Colorado never married or had children of his own.

== Legacy ==
Colorado received a number of awards and accolades for his bravery in the field of photojournalism. Colorado won the Simon Bolivar prize for journalism three times, along with the Caritas award in Switzerland. Additionally, Colorado won the CPJ International Press Freedom Award, appointed by the Committee to Protect Journalists. Jesus was the first photojournalist to win this award. Colorado was one of the first photojournalists to get in the midst of conflicts.
