= Dina Bosatta =

Italian Roman Catholic nun

Blessed Dina Bosatta
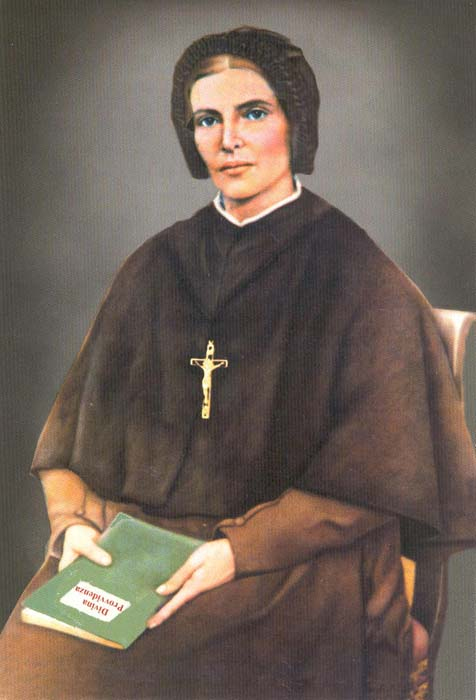

Religious
- Born: 27 May 1858; Pianello del Lario, Como, Kingdom of Sardinia
- Died: 20 April 1887 (aged 28); Pianello del Lario, Como, Kingdom of Italy
- Resting place: Sacred Heart Shrine, Como, Italy
- Venerated in: Roman Catholic Church
- Beatified: 21 April 1991, Saint Peter's Square, Vatican City by Pope John Paul II
- Feast: 20 April
- Attributes: Crucifix
- Patronage: Daughters of Saint Mary of Providence

Dina Bosatta (27 May 1858 – 20 April 1887) was an Italian Roman Catholic professed religious (nun) who became a professed member of the Daughters of Mary religious congregation alongside her sister Marcellina. Bosatta became a nun in 1878 and assumed the religious name of "Chiara" and devoted her life to God and to the social welfare of neglected children and to the poor.

Bosatta co-founded – alongside her sister and Luigi Guanella – the Daughters of Saint Mary of Providence – and managed the order in her hometown and the surrounding areas. In her service to the poor she contracted tuberculosis which remained with her until her death in 1887.

Pope John Paul II presided over her beatification on 21 April 1991.

== Life ==
Dina Bosatta was born in 1858 in Como to Alessandro Bosatta and Rosa Mazzocchi – her father worked as a silk manufacturer who died in 1861 when she was but a toddler. She was the last of eleven siblings and one sister was Marcellina.

She studied with the Daughters of Charity at the age of thirteen in 1871; she also took work as a janitor around this time. She decided to consecrate her life to God and made the decision to become a nun so entered into the period of novitiate with the Canossians from 1871 to 1878; however she felt that their charism was not that of which she felt she was being called to and so left that congregation to pursue her vocation elsewhere. Despite this she was enthralled with their charism nonetheless and admired their spirit and strong dedication to their rules of life. Bosatta returned to her home and joined with her sister Marcellina and the two joined the Daughters of Mary that Carlo Copponi had established; Marcellina would later become the superior of the order. The pair also worked at a hospice to tend to neglected children and older people as well as teaching children.

The pair coordinated efforts at establishing a new religious congregation – the Daughters of Saint Mary of Providence – alongside Luigi Guanella. It was at this point that she took the religious name of "Chiara". She was professed as a nun on 27 October 1878.

Tending to the poor bought unwanted consequences for Bosatta when she contracted tuberculosis – this disease would remain with her until the end of her life.

Bosatta died on 20 April 1887 of tuberculosis. She had suffered with the disease more than in the past in the autumn of 1886 and relocated back to her hometown hoping that a change of climate would benefit her.

== Beatification ==
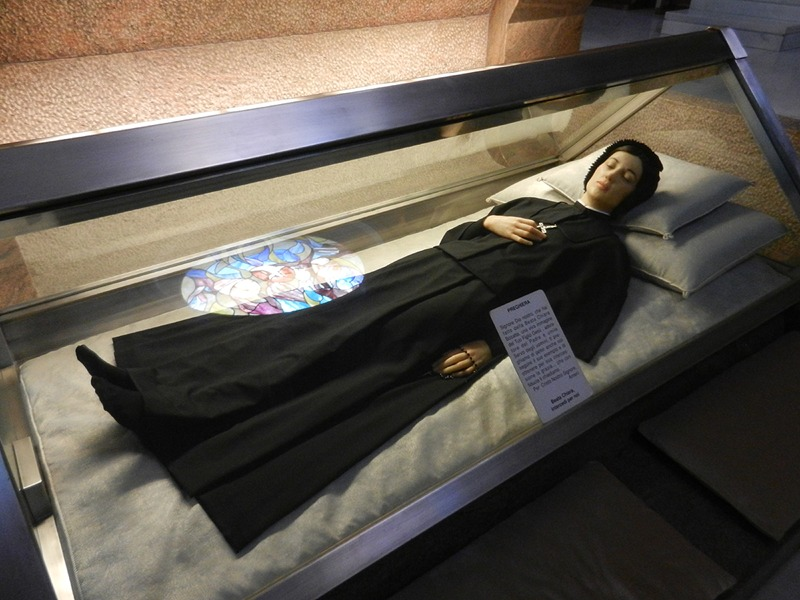
Tomb in Como.

The process for beatification commenced under the direction of the Cardinal Archbishop of Milan Andrea Carlo Ferrari in 1912 in a process that would gather documentation and writings that Bosatta left in life. On 10 July 1917, her cause was officially opened and she was granted the title Servant of God. Her writings were approved by theologians on 4 April 1948. The Positio was compiled in a comprehensive manner to note her life of virtue and biographical details and was submitted to the Congregation for the Causes of Saints in 1986 for their own evaluation.

Pope John Paul II approved the fact that Bosatta had lived a life of heroic virtue and declared her to be Venerable on 1 September 1988.

The process of the investigation of a potential miracle attributed to her intercession was investigated from 15 April 1950 until 22 December 1951. Investigation of the miracle in Rome did not occur until a few decades later when the Congregation for the Causes of Saints acknowledged the process and ratified it on 25 November 1998. The pope approved the healing to be a miracle in 1991 and beatified Bosatta on 21 April 1991.

The current postulator of the cause is Mario Carrera.
