= Caritas Ticino =

Swiss non-profit organisation

- Founded: 1942
- Founder: Angelo Giuseppe Jelmini it:Angelo Giuseppe Jelmini
- Purpose: Humanitarian aid, International development and social service
- Region served: Switzerland and Worldwide
- Affiliations: Caritas Switzerland
- Employees: 32
- Website: www.caritas-ticino.ch

Caritas Ticino is a non-profit organisation based in Ticino, Switzerland. It is one of the regional organisations of the national Caritas Switzerland.

== History ==
The Latin word Caritas (or Charitas) defines culture in the Christian dimension of love of God and human beings, and has been adopted as the name of all the charitable organizations/social that have developed in the Western world. In Ticino, the Italian speaking part of Switzerland, in 1942 the Bishop Angelo Giuseppe Jelmini created a diocesan Caritas, Caritas Ticino, to address the social problems of the post war period and especially in relation to refugees from war. Over the decades the organization has followed the development of the welfare state are becoming partners of the Republic and Canton of Ticino. In particular it developed a social service specialist advice on debt, an employment program for the reintegration of the unemployed into employment with a hundred seats in the recycling industry and agriculture and industry information with a television production that is unique for a charitable organization. The thought that drives social action organization refers to the Catholic social teaching of the church, and in particular the 2009 encyclical, Caritas in Veritate of Pope Benedict XVI, in addition to the lines left by the Bishop of Lugano, in Roman Catholic Diocese of Lugano, Eugenio Corecco in 1992.

== Thought ==
"Whatever should be the nature of the industry and its interventions in the social field, Caritas is called, with ever greater urgency, to express in society two specific values of Christianity, whose social significance can not be measured purely rational. The first is the gratuity to the man in trouble, because it was free also the redemption offered to us by Christ. The second is to oversupply, excess is the love of Christ for us. The charity has so far as the needs of others, but the richness of God's love limiting it to look and evaluate it from man's need, because man is more than its needs".

== Sources ==
- DIOCESI DI LUGANO E CARITÀ: DALLA STORIA UNO SGUARDO AL FUTURO: contributi per una storia dell'azione caritativa e assistenziale dei cattolici nel Canton Ticino; A. Abächerli, A. Gandolla, A. Gili, A. Lepori
- Tra privato sociale e carità ripensare a nuovi modelli di welfare; E. Corecco, P. Donati, C. Marazzi, R. Respini, E. Bressan, G. Contri, J. Petrovic, M. A. Sergé, J.L. Trouillard, H. Bausch, M. Lepori Bonetti, R. Noris, G. Pasini
- From need to oversupply; + Mons. Eugenio Corecco
- Eugenio Corecco un Vescovo e la sua Chiesa vol.2 di Ernesto William Volonté ed. Cantagalli 2005
- Charta Caritatis
- Ars Caritatis
