= Ernesto Togni =

Swiss Roman Catholic prelate (1925–2022)

His Excellency Ernesto Togni
- Bishop Emeritus of Lugano
- Appointed: 15 July 1978
- Term ended: 21 June 1985
- Predecessor: Giuseppe Martinoli
- Successor: Eugenio Corecco

Orders
- Ordination: 7 May 1950 by Angelo Giuseppe Jelmini
- Consecration: 17 September 1978 by Ambrogio Marchioni

Personal details
- Born: 6 October 1926 Brione (Verzasca), Switzerland
- Died: 11 November 2022 (aged 96) San Nazarro, Switzerland

Ernesto Togni (6 October 1926 – 11 November 2022) was a Swiss Roman Catholic prelate.

Togni was born in Switzerland and was ordained to the priesthood in 1950. He served as bishop of the Roman Catholic Diocese of Lugano from 1978 until his resignation in 1985.

Catholic Church titles
Preceded by Giuseppe Martinoli	Bishop of Lugano; 1978–1985	Succeeded by Eugenio Corecco
