= Daughters of Saint Mary of Providence =

Religious Institute

The Daughters of Saint Mary of Providence (Italian: Figlie di Santa Maria della Divina Provvidenza; Latin: Congregatio Filiarum a Sancta Maria Providentiae; abbreviation: F.S.M.P.) is a religious institute of pontifical right whose members profess public vows of chastity, poverty, and obedience and follow the evangelical way of life in common.

Their works included instruction and religious education of youth and care of the elderly, orphans and sick.

The institute traces its origins to 1872 at Pianello del Lario, Italy, when it was created by Carlo Coppini; this group of lay volunteers was formed to minister to orphans and elderly in the parish of Pianello. The group grew under the leadership of Dina Bosatta (later Mother Chiara), who is considered one of the founders. In 1881 Luigi Guanella became the new parish priest of Pianello and the group was placed under his direction. As the ecclesiastical superior, Guanella took an active interest in the development of this religious community; he helped to arrange for the formulation of its rule, its expansion, and its approval. The institute also honors Luigi Guanella as its founder.

Members of the group opened a mission in Chicago in 1913.

The sisters have houses in Argentina, Brazil, Canada, Chile, Colombia, India, Italy, Mexico, Paraguay, Philippines, Romania, Spain, Switzerland and United States. The Generalate of the Congregation can be found in Rome, Italy.

On 31 December 2005 there are 723 sisters in 115 communities.
