= Diocese of Lugano =

Latin Catholic diocese in Switzerland

Coordinates: 46.0000°N 8.9500°E

Diocese of Lugano Dioecesis Luganensis Diocesi di Lugano

Catholic
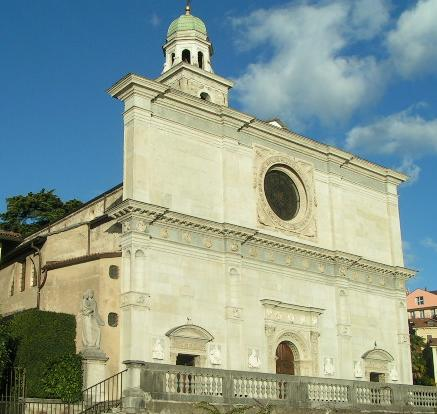
- Lugano Cathedral

Location
- Country: Switzerland
- Metropolitan: Immediately subject to the Holy See

Statistics
- Area: 2,811 km^{2} (1,085 sq mi)
- Population: Total; Catholics: (as of 2019); 353,920; 247,800 (70%)

Information
- Denomination: Catholic Church
- Sui iuris church: Latin Church
- Rite: Roman and Ambrosian
- Established: 8 March 1971
- Cathedral: Cathedral of Saint Lawrence (Lugano)
- Patron saint: Charles Borromeo

Current leadership
- Pope: Leo XIV
- Bishop: vacant
- Apostolic Administrator: Alain de Raemy
- Vicar General: Ernesto Storelli
- Bishops emeritus: Pier Giacomo Grampa; Valerio Lazzeri

Map

Website
- Website of the Diocese

The Diocese of Lugano (Latin: Dioecesis Luganensis) is a Latin Church ecclesiastical territory or diocese of the Catholic Church in Switzerland covering the canton of Ticino. The diocese immediately subject to the Holy See. In 2004, there were 233,017 baptised persons of 306,846 inhabitants. It has as its principal patron Charles Borromeo, Archbishop of Milan, and as a secondary patron Abundius, Bishop of Como.

== History ==
The Diocese of Lugano was erected by a Bull of Leo XIII (7 September 1888). The territory covered is that of the Swiss canton of Ticino, where the population is almost entirely Catholic and Italian is the common language.

Before the Diocese of Lugano was founded, the Canton of Ticino was under the jurisdiction, in ecclesiastical matters, of bishops who were not Swiss. The smaller, northern part belonged to the Archdiocese of Milan, and, consequently, still uses the Ambrosian Rite; the other, and much larger, part of the canton belonged to the Diocese of Como.

Soon after the formation of the Canton of Ticino, in 1803, efforts were made to separate it in its church relations as well as from foreign powers and to unite it in these with the rest of Switzerland. But it was several decades before the Great Council, in 1855, went thoroughly into the matter. Without consultation with the Holy See, the Federal Council in 1859 declared the jurisdiction of the Bishops of Como and Milan to be abolished in the territory of Switzerland; after this negotiations were begun with Rome.

No settlement of the question was reached until the pontificate of Leo XIII. By the convention of 1 September 1884, made between the Curia and the Federal Council, Ticino was canonically separated from its former diocesan connections and was placed provisionally, under an administrator Apostolic, the pope appointing as administrator Bishop Lachat of Basle. After Lachat's death (1886), the new Bishopric of Ticino was formed by the Bull of circumscription "Ad universam" of Leo XIII (7 September 1888), and united with the Diocese of Basle under the title of the Diocese of Basle-Lugano.

The same year the Church of San Lorenzo in Lugano was elevated to a cathedral. The union was merely a nominal one, for, although the Bishop of Basle was called the Bishop of Lugano he exercised no rights of jurisdiction in this diocese. It was, in reality, under the independent rule of an administrator Apostolic who had the rank and power of a bishop.

He was appointed by the pope with the concurrence of the Bishop of Basle from among the members of the clergy of the Canton of Ticino. The first administrator Apostolic was Eugene Lachat; he was followed by Vincent Molo (1887–1904), and Alfred Peri-Morosini. The latter was born 12 March 1862, and was consecrated 17 April 1904.

On 8 March 1971 the apostolic administration of the Canton Ticino was separated from the diocese of Basel, and, by virtue of the bull Paroecialis et collegialis of Pope Paul VI, became an independent diocese. Giuseppe Martinoli became the first bishop of Lugano. From 1978 to 1986 Ernesto Togni was bishop of Lugano, who was succeeded in 1986 Eugenio Corecco, under whose episcopate was formed the Academic Institute of Theology of Lugano, who became a decree of the Congregation for Catholic Education of 20 November 1993 a faculty of Theology.

The diocese's Cathedral of San Lorenzo at Lugano was built in the fifteenth and sixteenth centuries and has a celebrated Renaissance façade; the most frequented place of pilgrimage is the shrine of the Madonna del Sasso not far from Locarno, which is the national shrine of the Canton of Ticino.

According to the convention of 24 July 1968 between the Canton of Ticino and the Holy See, the Bishop of Lugano can be appointed freely by the Holy See, but the choice must necessarily fall upon priests who are citizens of Ticino. For this reason, the current apostolic administrator, who comes from the Canton of Fribourg, continues to govern the diocese as an apostolic administrator and not as a diocesan bishop because he does not meet the requirements established by the convention.

=== Apostolic Administrator of Ticino ===
- Eugène Lachat, † (18 dicembre 1884 - 1º November 1886)
- Vincenzo Molo † (20 September 1887 - 15 March 1904)
- Alfredo Peri-Morosini † (28 March 1904 - 29 December 1916)
- Stefano Aurelio Bacciarini † (12 January 1917 - 27 June 1935)
- Angelo Giuseppe Jelmini † (16 December 1935 - 24 June 1968)
- Giuseppe Martinoli † (30 July 1968 - 8 March 1971 appointed Bishop of Lugano)

=== Bishops of Lugano ===
- Giuseppe Martinoli † (8 March 1971 - 15 July 1978 retired)
- Ernesto Togni † (15 July 1978 - 21 June 1985 resigned)
- Eugenio Corecco † (5 June 1986 - 1º March 1995)
- Giuseppe Torti † (9 June 1995 - 18 December 2003 retired)
- Pier Giacomo Grampa (18 December 2003 - 4 November 2013 retired)
- Valerio Lazzeri (4 November 2013 - 10 October 2022 resigned)
  - Sede vacante (dal 2022)
  - Alain de Raemy, since 10 October 2022 (apostolic administrator)
