= Luigi Guanella =

Italian Catholic priest and saint (1842–1915)

Saint Luigi Guanella
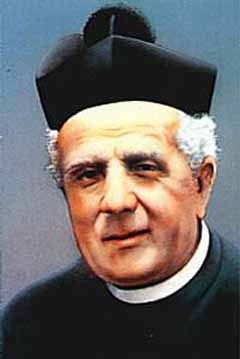

Priest
- Born: 19 December 1842; Fraciscio, Campodolcino, Kingdom of Lombardy–Venetia
- Died: 24 October 1915 (aged 72); Como, Kingdom of Italy
- Venerated in: Roman Catholic Church
- Beatified: 25 October 1964, Saint Peter's Basilica, Vatican City by Pope Paul VI
- Canonized: 23 October 2011, Saint Peter's Square, Vatican City by Pope Benedict XVI
- Major shrine: Shrine of the Sacred Heart, Como
- Feast: 24 October
- Attributes: Cassock
- Patronage: Daughters of Saint Mary of Providence; Servants of Charity; Pious Union of Saint Joseph

Luigi Guanella (19 December 1842 – 24 October 1915) was an Italian Catholic priest who founded several religious communities. He was beatified on 25 October 1964 by Pope Paul VI and was canonized on 23 October 2011 in a celebration that Pope Benedict XVI celebrated in Saint Peter's Square.

== Religious communities ==
He founded the Daughters of Saint Mary of Providence (1890) and the Servants of Charity (1908) alongside his friends David Albertario and Giuseppe Toniolo. Guanella also founded the Pious Union of Saint Joseph (1914) with his supporter and first member, Pope Pius X. These religious communities focused on the relief of the poor throughout the world. The Servants of Charity motto is "In Omnibus Charitas" ("In all things Love"), which became the cornerstone for Guanella's own life.

== Canonization ==
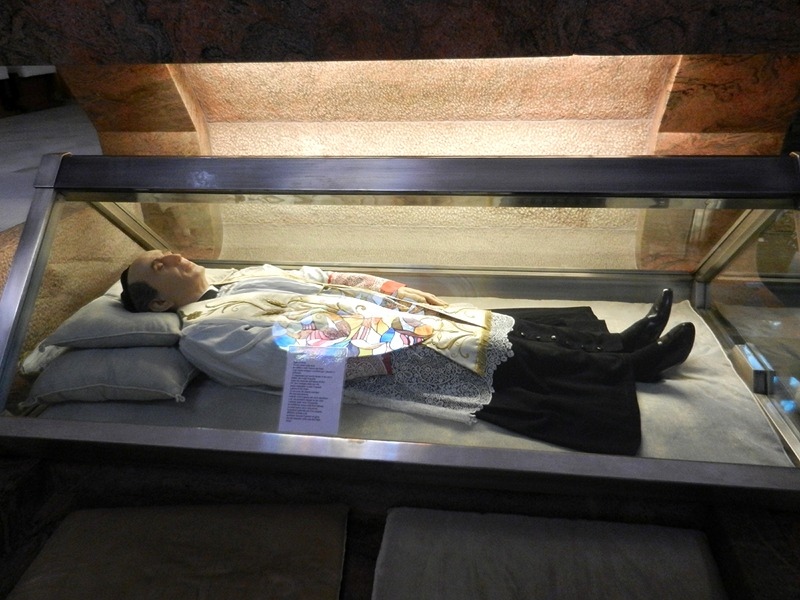
Tomb.

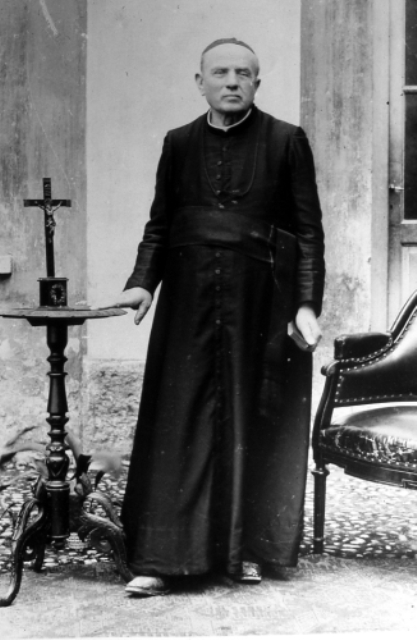
Guanella in Como in 1912.

=== Process and Venerable ===
The informative process for the sanctification cause commenced in Como on 1 February 1923 and had been tasked in compiling available evidence and documentation that could establish both a biographical profile and reasons that would attest to the late priest's saintliness; the process closed on 21 May 1929. Theologians compiled all of his writings and were assigned to ascertain whether or not his texts were in line with the magisterium of the Roman Catholic Church; the team approved them all in a decree of 12 July 1932.

The formal introduction of the cause came on 15 March 1939 - during the pontificate of Pope Pius XII - in which the honorific title of Servant of God was granted to Guanella as the first official stage in the process.

The apostolic process that opened after this formal introduction was held also in Como and spanned from 27 June 1940 and concluded its business on 10 October 1941. Both processes were taken to Rome to the Congregation of Rites for validation on 13 April 1945.

The late priest was proclaimed to be Venerable on 6 April 1962 after Pope John XXIII acknowledged the fact that Guanella had lived a model Christian life of exemplified heroic virtue.

=== Beatification ===
The informative diocesan process for the first miracle needed for beatification opened in the Diocese of Como on 20 November 1942 and closed on 28 November 1942. The informative process for the second miracle needed opened in Vittorio Veneto on 29 November 1942 and closed after less than a week on 2 December 1942. The two processes were validated on 27 July 1962 while both miracles received formal papal approval on 15 July 1964.

On 25 October 1964 - in Saint Peter's Basilica - Pope Paul VI beatified Luigi Guanella.

==== Second miracle ====
According to Catholic News Service (CNS) the miracle needed for his canonization was the healing of an adult male - William Glisson (who was 21 at the time of his accident and is now married) - from the United States of America who had fallen over a hole and hit his head while skating backward without a helmet rollerblading down the Baltimore Pike in Springfield. He needed two separate skull surgeries and was in a coma for a fortnight with a grave prognosis. A doctor - who was both a friend and worked at a rehabilitation center that the Opera Don Guanella ran - gave Glisson's mother two relics of the late priest. The Opera's website stated that Glisson was released from the hospital less than a month after the accident and returned to work just seven months later in what was seen as a rapid healing for someone in his condition.

=== Canonization ===
The third miracle that would result in eventual canonization was investigated in the diocese of its origin in the United States of America and the process concluded its assignment on 19 February 2007. It received validation on 20 April 2007 which enabled the Congregation for the Causes of Saints to commence their own investigation into the alleged miracle. The medical board approved it on 12 November 2009 while theologians followed suit on 30 January 2010. The C.C.S. also granted assent on 20 April 2010 while Pope Benedict XVI gave his final approval to the miracle on 1 July 2010.

Benedict XVI canonized Luigi Guanella as a saint of the Roman Catholic Church on 23 October 2011.

=== Postulator ===
The assigned postulator at the time of the canonization was the Rev. Mario Carrera.
