= Caritas Switzerland =

Swiss Catholic welfare and relief organisation

- Four official names: Caritas Schweiz (German); Caritas Suisse (French); Caritas Svizerra (Italian); Caritas Svizra (Romansh)
- Abbreviation: CACH
- Established: 1901; 125 years ago
- Type: Nonprofit
- Legal status: Association
- Location(s): Adligenswilerstrasse 15; Lucerne, Switzerland
- Coordinates: 47.05625°N 8.31511°E
- Origins: Catholic Social Teaching
- Region served: Switzerland and worldwide
- Fields: social work, social policy, humanitarian aid, development aid
- President: Monika Maire-Hefti
- Affiliations: Caritas Europa, Caritas Internationalis
- Revenue: CHF 149,499,500 (2023)
- Expenses: CHF 157,066,195 (2023)
- Staff: 615 (full-time equivalent of 488) (2023)
- Website: www.caritas.ch

Caritas Switzerland (German: Caritas Schweiz, French: Caritas Suisse, Italian: Caritas Svizzra, Romansh: Caritas Svizra) is a Swiss Catholic not-for-profit organisation. Its mission is to prevent, combat and alleviate poverty.

It is a member of both Caritas Europa and Caritas Internationalis.

== History ==
=== Beginning and wars ===
In 1901, a Caritas division was founded within the Swiss Catholic Association (Schweizer Katholikenverein), modelled on the German Caritas Association, established four years prior. It brought together several Swiss associations but was not able to truly unite the various social charitable organisations and associations in Swiss Catholicism into a whole. Fr. Rufin Steimer (1866–1928) was the first president.

After the First World War, in 1919, the central Caritas office in Lucerne was established. It organised the Catholic aid activities for war-affected Europe, in particular children's aid. The Caritas association was legally registered in 1927 and finally brought together all associations and institutions that were active in Swiss Catholicism. The following decades were marked by a period of professionalisation and centralisation.

According to the Caritas concept, the parishes were supposed to organise social and charitable activities at a local level, with varying degrees of success and effectiveness. Special Caritas Sundays, featuring illustrated presentations and other activities, were organised to raise awareness among parishioners. Additionally, beyond the parishes, Caritas provided additional religious, ideological, and professional training to professionals working in institutions, homes, and hospitals.

In the late 1920s, the organisation worked with specific vulnerable groups, including children and youth, tuberculosis patients, the elderly, alcoholics, people with different disabilities, etc. In the field of curative education, Caritas founded curative institutes in Lucerne in 1932 and at the University of Fribourg in 1936.

Following Hitler's rise to power in Germany in 1933, the refugee problem increasingly became a focus for Caritas Switzerland. In 1936, the Commission for Catholic Refugee Aid was founded. After the Anschluss of Austria in 1938, the financial costs of Caritas' refugee assistance escalated due to a rapid increase in the number of Catholic refugees. By the end of the war in 1945, Caritas was providing care for approximately 18,000 refugees.

=== Since the 1950s ===
The rapid post-war expansion had repercussions for the Caritas organisation. Internal crises emerged, leading to the resignation of Director Giuseppe Crivelli and prompting a revision of the statutes in 1950. Starting from the latter part of the 1950s, Caritas started supporting other refugees, this time from the European Eastern Bloc, providing assistance to around half of the more than 10,000 Hungarian refugees arriving in Switzerland in 1956 after the failed Hungarian Revolution. From 1968/69, the organisation assisted thousands of Czechs and Slovaks who were granted asylum after the Prague Spring. During the 1960s, the focus shifted towards emergency and disaster relief efforts. Caritas organised campaigns for India (1965/1966), flood victims in Portugal and in Romania (1967 and 1970), as well ass for victims of the 1968 Belice earthquake in Sicily and the 1970 Ancash earthquake in Peru.

A significant relief operation took place between 1968 and 1970 for victims of the Biafran War in Nigeria, bringing in more than 11 million CHF in donations. This surpassed the association's existing infrastructure capabilities and triggered a period of growth, followed by another internal crisis, which culminated in 1971 with the resignation of Director Peter Kuhn (1935–1995). Subsequently, a revision of the statutes the following year was initiated, leading to an internal reform within the organisation.

During the 1970s and 1980s, Caritas Switzerland evolved into a multi-sector aid organisation with a broad scope of activities, encompassing social initiatives in Switzerland and disaster and development aid internationally. Starting in 1982, it redirected its efforts from short-term emergency assistance towards longer-term reconstruction aid.

== Structure and work ==
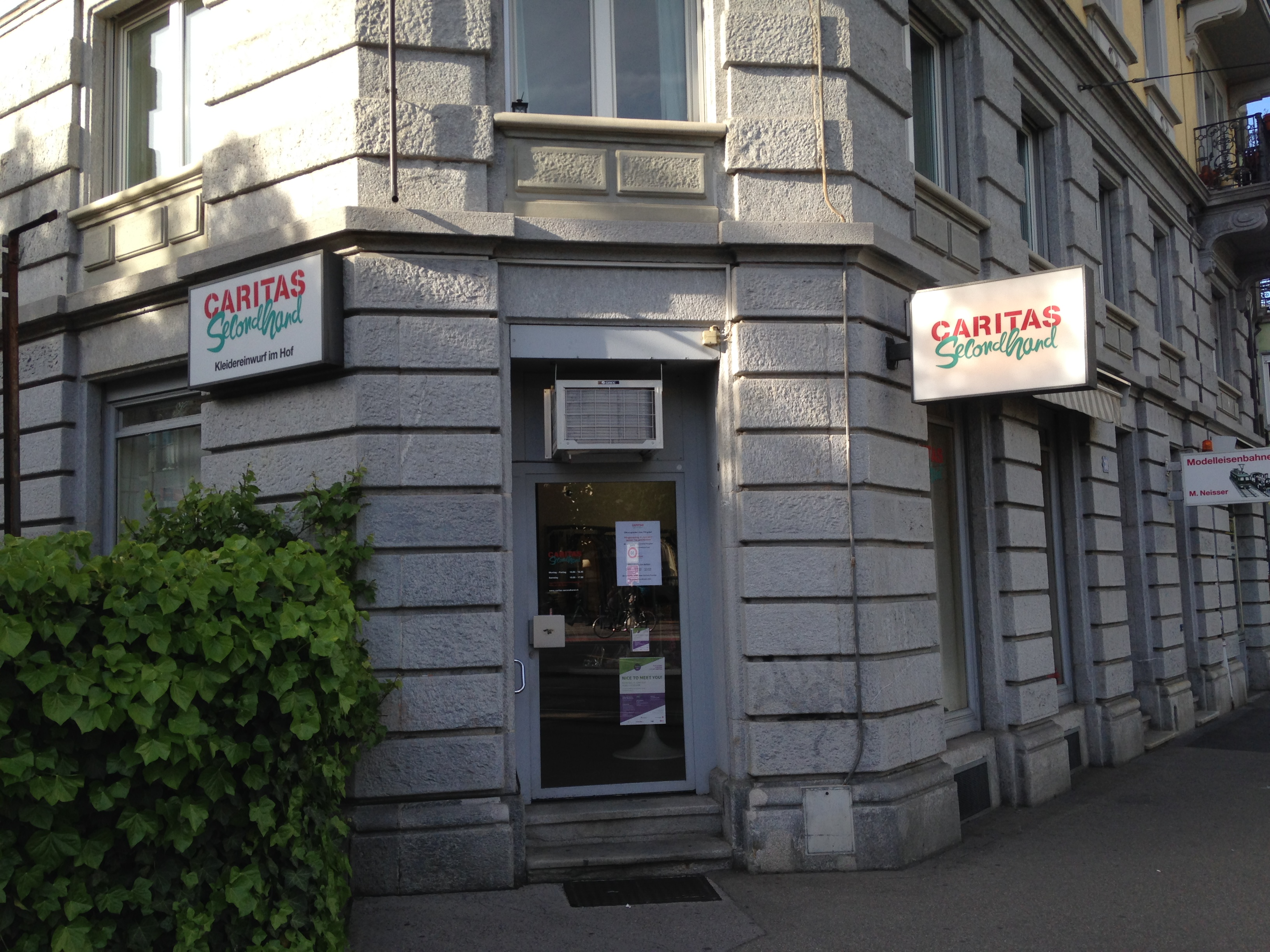
A Caritas secondhand clothing shop in Zürich

Caritas Switzerland consists of 16 regional, independent Caritas organisations in Switzerland. They implement social projects locally. Together with Caritas Switzerland, they are involved in nationwide campaigns to reduce poverty, as well as in specific activities such as debt counselling and the operation of the Caritas social supermarkets. The regional Caritas organisations support people affected by poverty in Switzerland and contribute therewith to social integration.

With its programmes and political work, Caritas helps to ensure that people in need, regardless of their political or religious beliefs, gender or ethnicity, can take advantage of their opportunities and have access to food, shelter, healthcare, education and work.

The 16 local organisations are:

- Caritas Aargau
- Caritas beider Basel ("Caritas of both Basels")
- Caritas Bern
- Caritas Fribourg
- Caritas Geneva
- Caritas Grisons (Graubünden)
- Caritas Jura
- Caritas Lucerne
- Caritas Neuchâtel
- Caritas Solothurn
- Caritas St. Gallen-Appenzell
- Caritas Thurgau
- Caritas Ticino
- Caritas Valais
- Caritas Vaud
- Caritas Zürich

Internationally, Caritas Switzerland implemented projects in 2023 in around 20 countries in Africa, Asia, Europa and Latin America, through its in-country local offices and by supporting local partner organisations.

== Prix Caritas ==
Since 2003, Caritas Switzerland has awarded the Prix Caritas ('Caritas Prize') to people who have made an outstanding contribution in the fields of social work, development cooperation or intercultural understanding. The award winner receives 10,000 Swiss francs. The recipients are:

- 2003: Shay Cullen, for his commitment to human rights and anti-trafficking in the Philippines.
- 2004: Rosiamo Ashurova and Saodat Kamalova, doctors from Tajikistan, for their commitment to human dignity in a society in crisis.
- 2005: Paride Taban, Bishop, for his decades-long commitment to peace and justice in South Sudan.
- 2006: Jesús Abad Colorado, Colombian photojournalist, for his commitment to peace and justice in Colombia.
- 2007: Fr. Jean-Marie Viénat and Sr. Anne Féser for their commitment in the service of persons experiencing poverty in Switzerland.
- 2008: Jacinta Torres, Dominican educator, for her work with mentally and physically handicapped children.
- 2009: Ibrahim Muhammad, for his commitment to the education of disadvantaged children and young people.
- 2010: Sr. Vicenzina Dallai and Fr. Gérard Dorméville for their commitment to the education of socially disadvantaged children and young people in Gonaïves, Haiti.
- 2011: Cecilia Flores-Oebanda for her commitment to women and girls, to victims of human trafficking, and to combating sexual exploitation and other forms of violence in the Philippines.
- 2012: José María Romero for his commitment to the right to land ownership of indigenous people in Guatemala.
- 2013: Rachel Newton for her commitment to the rights and protection of children in the autonomous Kurdish region of northern Iraq.
- 2014: Nawras Sammour SJ and Wael Suleiman for their work for displaced people in Syria and neighbouring Jordan since the outbreak of the war.
- 2015: Gabriele del Grande, Italian journalist and blogger for publicly speaking out on behalf of migrants stranded at the gates of Europe for over ten years.
- 2016: Alice Achan for her commitment to promote the education and training of girls and very young mothers in Uganda.
- 2017: Luz Estela Romero and Ricardo Esquivia, for their fight for a sustainable peace process and respect for human rights in Colombia.
- 2018: Sovannarith Sam for his work to protect the rights of children in Cambodia.
- 2019: Frei Adailson Quintino dos Santos and Lucimar Correa for their fight for the protection of street children and children's rights in Rio de Janeiro, Brazil.
- 2020: cancelled because of the COVID-19 pandemic
- 2021: Thomas Stocker, co-author of the co-authored the UN reports of the Intergovernmental Panel on Climate Change.
- 2022: Lea Hungerbühler for her commitment to the rights of people on the run and usage of new approaches to help people seeking protection to assert their rights.
- 2023: Tetiana Stawnychy, President of Caritas Ukraine, for the vital humanitarian aid her organisation is providing following the Russian invasion of Ukraine.
- 2024: not awarded
