= Lugano Cathedral =

Cathedral in Switzerland

Coordinates: 46.0046°N 8.9486°E

- Cathedral of St Lawrence, Lugano
- Cattedrale di San Lorenzo
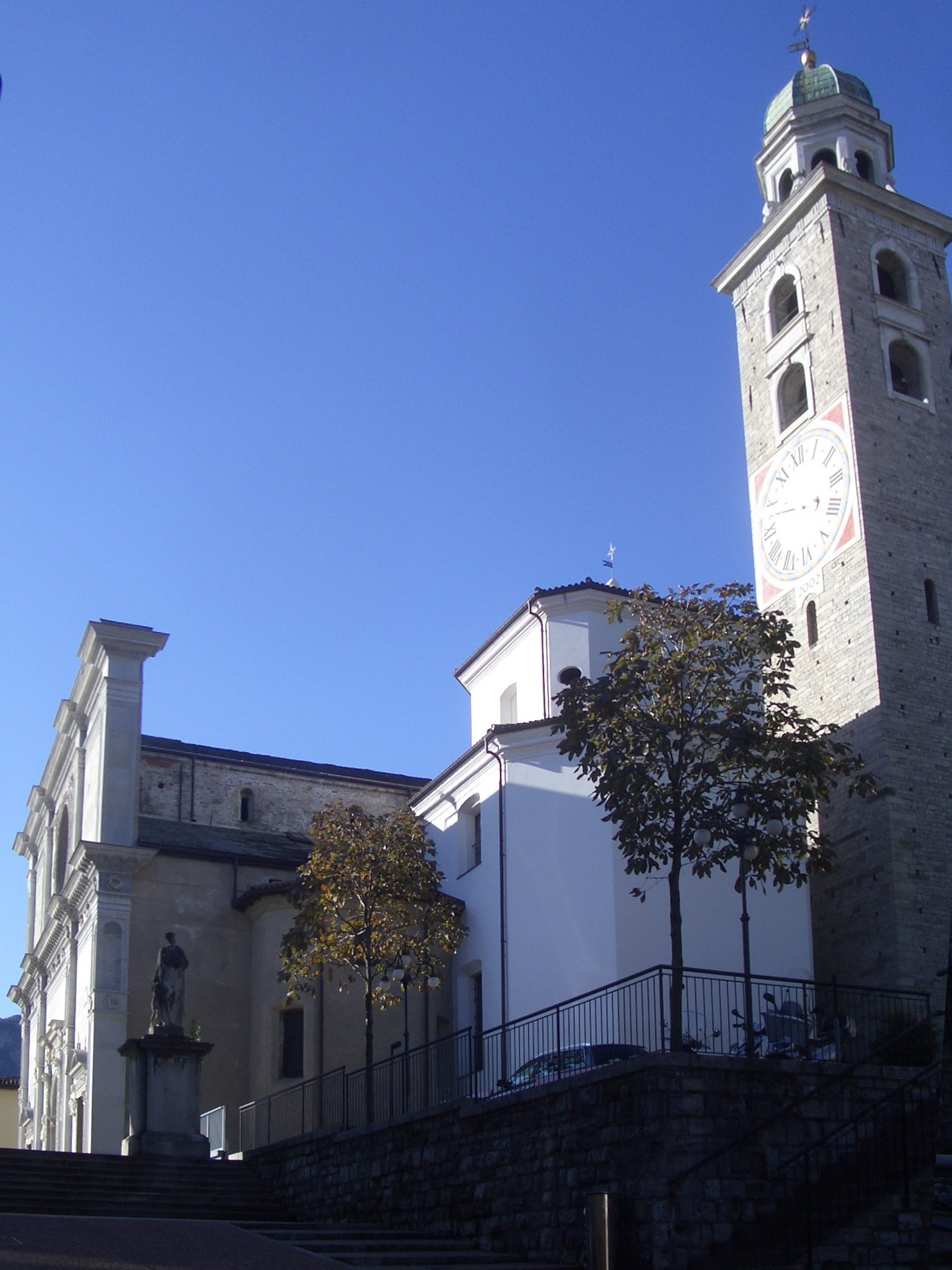
- Side view of the cathedral
- Lugano Cathedral
- Country: Switzerland
- Denomination: Roman Catholic

History
- Status: Active
- Founded: 818

Architecture
- Functional status: Cathedral and Collegiate Church
- Style: Gothic architecture, Renaissance, Baroque

Administration
- Diocese: Diocese of Lugano

Clergy
- Bishop: Alain de Raemy (ad interim)

Lugano Cathedral (Italian: Cattedrale di San Lorenzo) is a Roman Catholic cathedral dedicated to Saint Lawrence in Lugano, Ticino, Switzerland. It was founded in the High Middle Ages but rebuilt in the late 15th century, with the façade completed in 1517. It is the seat of the Bishop of Lugano.

== History ==
The church is known on this site from 818. In 1078 it was made a collegiate church, becoming a cathedral in 1888. The original Romanesque building was oriented the opposite way to the present church, as is shown by remains of the apse discovered under the current parvise. In the 15th century the church was expanded and the entrance moved to the present position, while the open roof was covered by a groin vaulted ceiling.

There were extensive renovations in 1905-1910, when some Baroque chapels were demolished and the interior received frescoes by Ernesto Rusca.

== Architectural details ==
The church's main feature is its facade, which was inspired by Giovanni Antonio Amadeo's Certosa di Pavia. It is made of white stone from Saltrio and Viggiù and of Carrara marble, and is divided in three sectors by four false columns supporting the entablature. In the middle sector is the main portal and a large rose window with decoration of cherubs executed after 1578. The decorations of the portals' frames are of high quality, with figures of puttoes, birds and lion-protomes. The central portal, called the "Saints Portal", has five medallions with reliefs, depicting four saints and, in the middle, the Virgin with Child. Between the portal's frame and the entablature are two angels carrying torches, resembling the decoration of the Roman triumphal arches.

Between the portals, inside square frames, are busts of the Four Evangelists and of the Kings Solomon and David. The entablature frieze has 17 figures, including biblical characters and the Sibyls. Also present are animal figures, while a restoration in 2002 showed traces of a fresco. The main portal of the Romanesque church is now moved to the sacristy.

The bell tower dates, in its lower part, to the Romanesque church. The two upper storey are in the Baroque style with an octagonal lantern covered by a cupola, designed by Costante Tencalla.

== Gallery ==
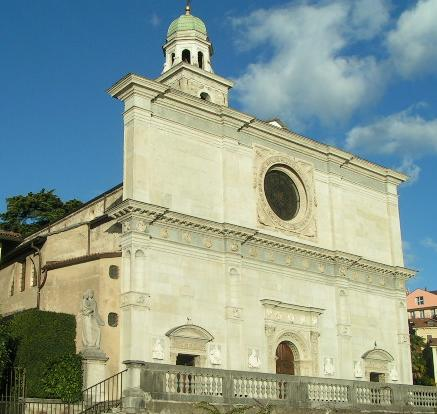
The façade

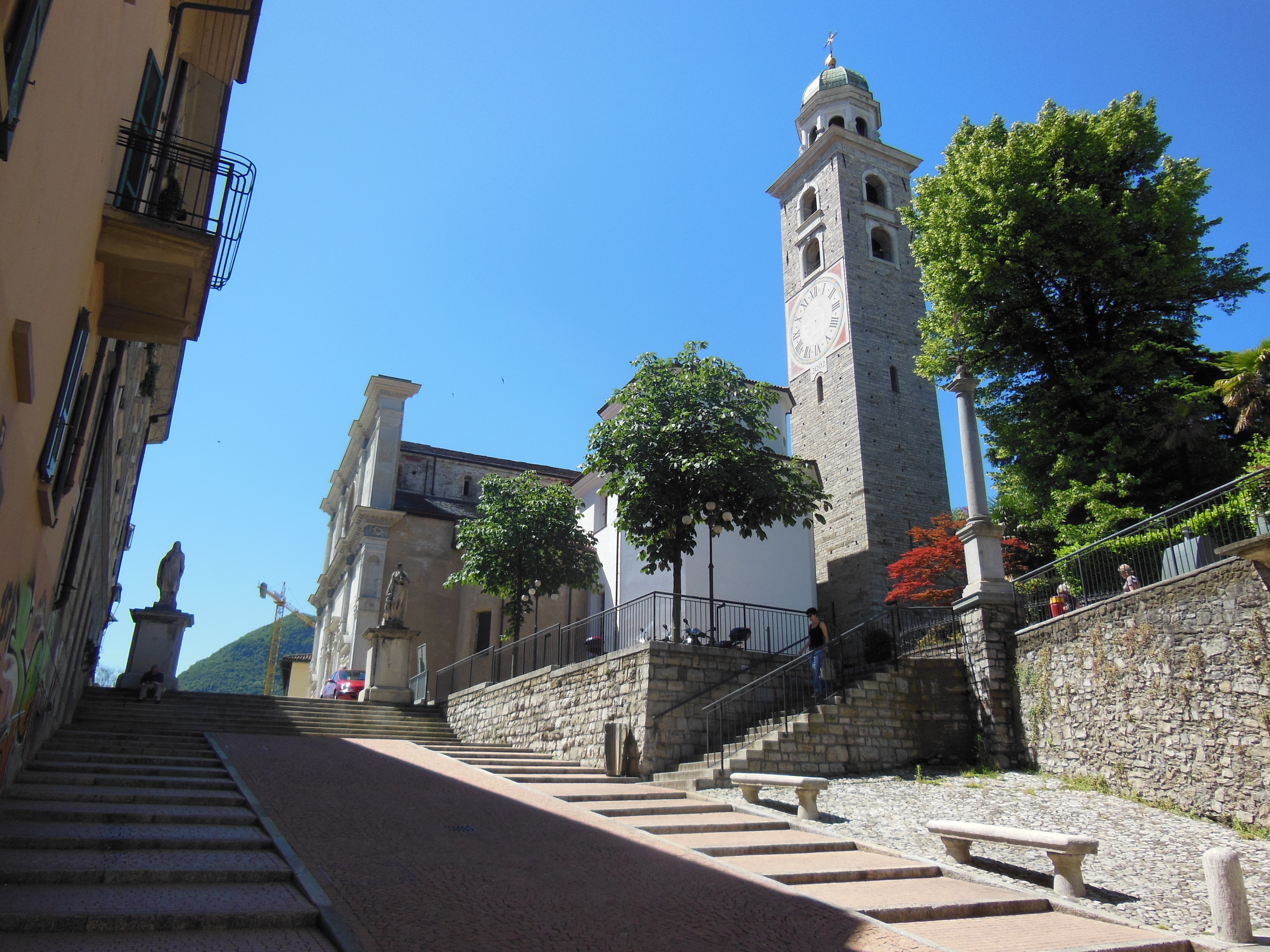
The cathedral from the top of the Via Cattedrale

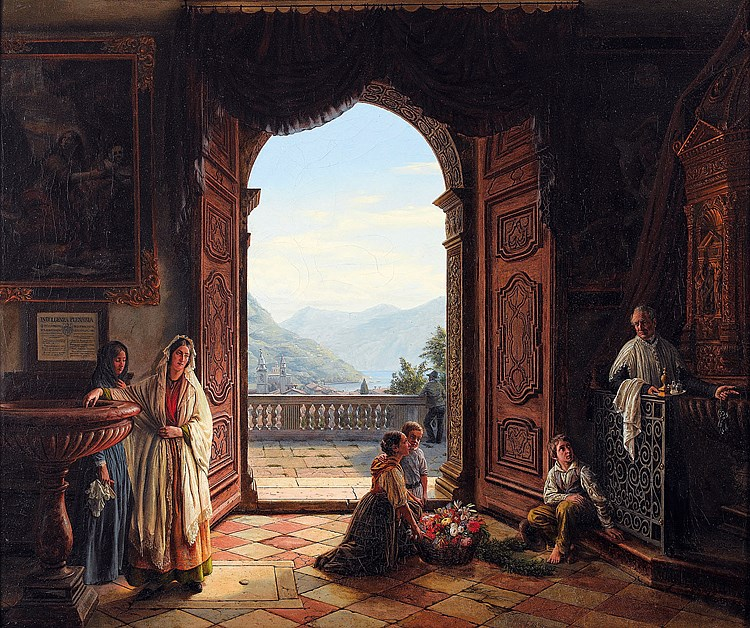
Interior of Lugano Cathedral

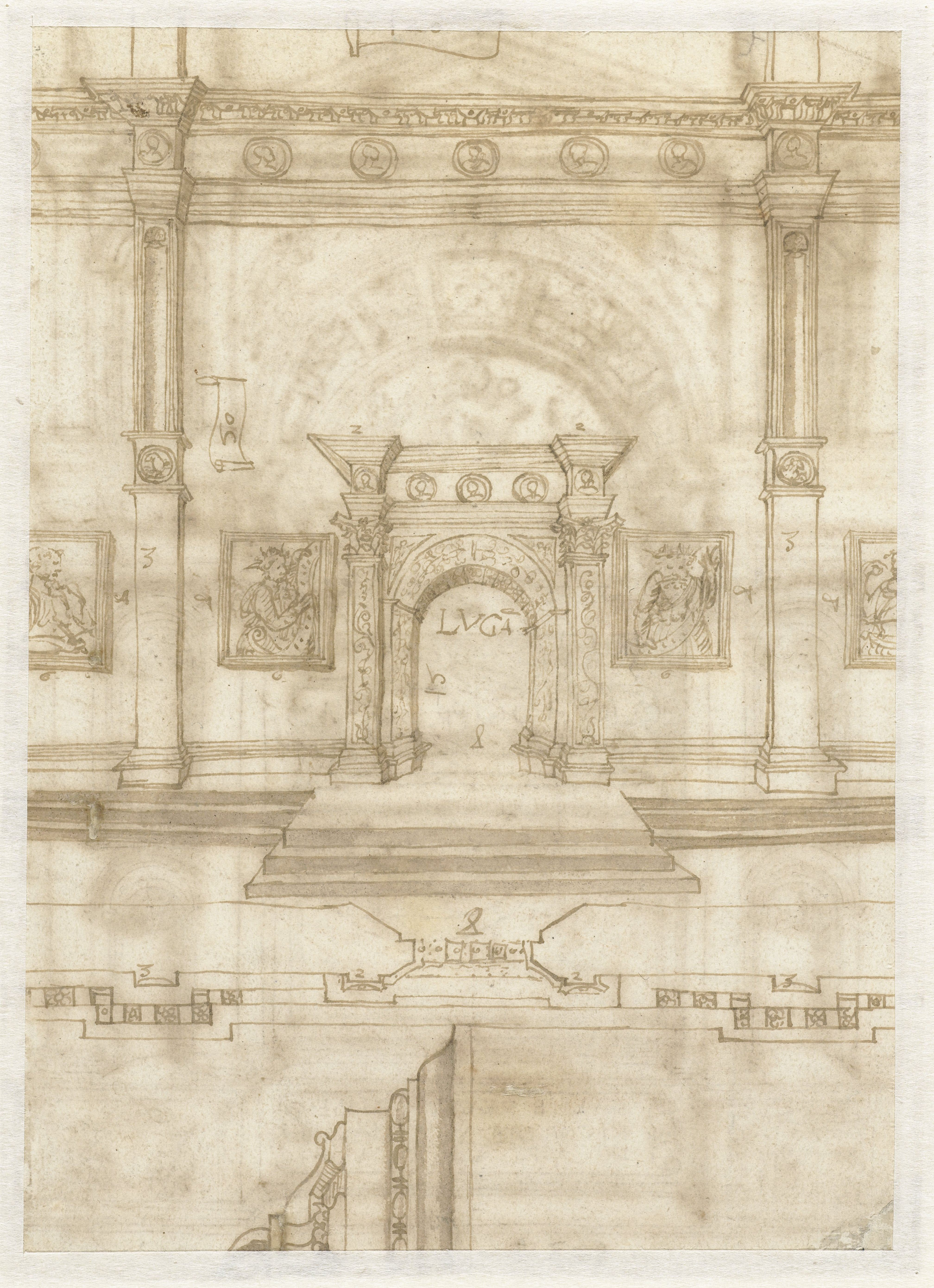
Drawing of the Lugano Cathedral, 1538
