= American College (Leuven) =

Former Roman Catholic seminary in Leuven, Belgium

Coordinates: 50°52′23″N 4°41′58″E

- KU Leuven
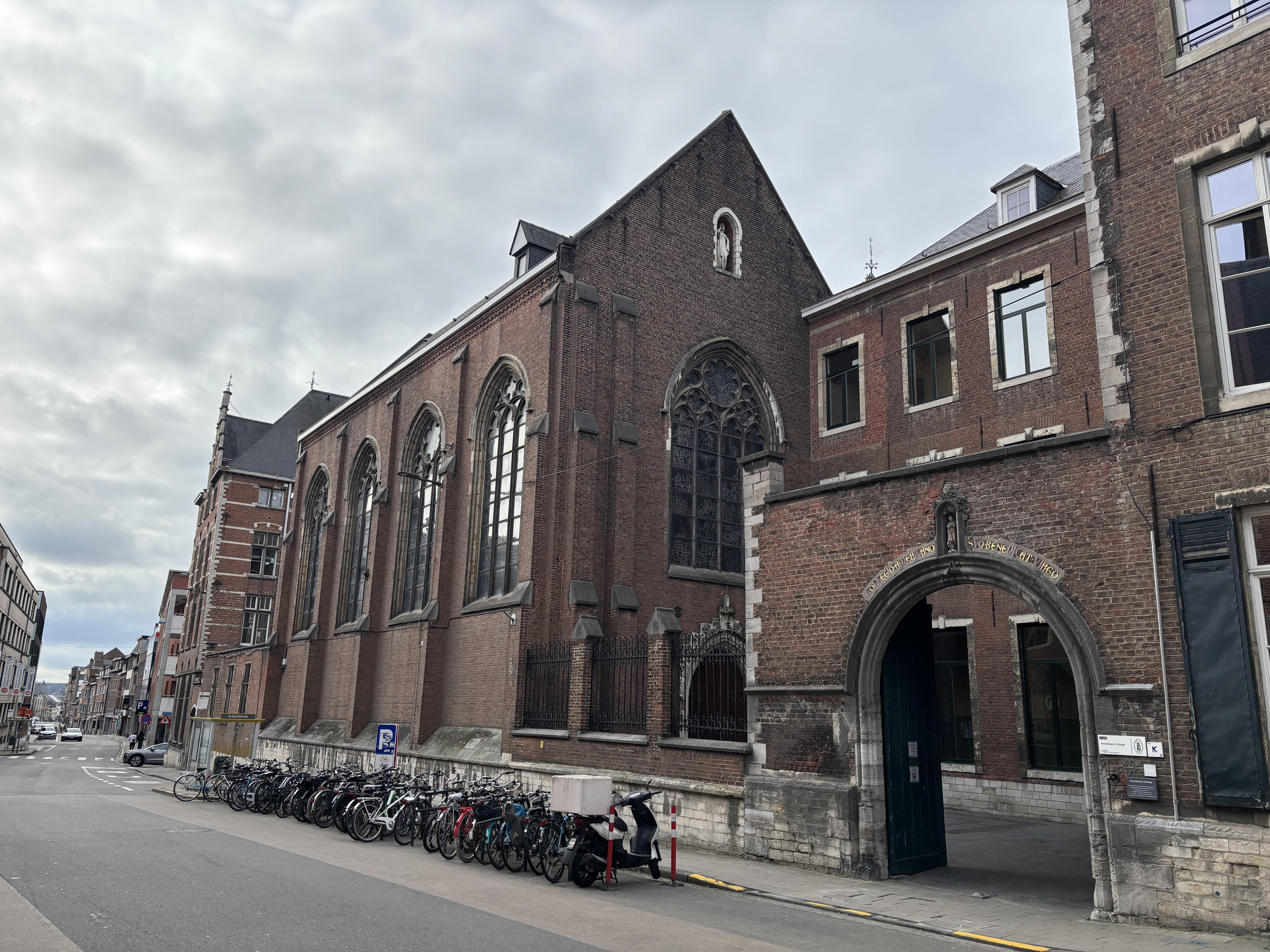

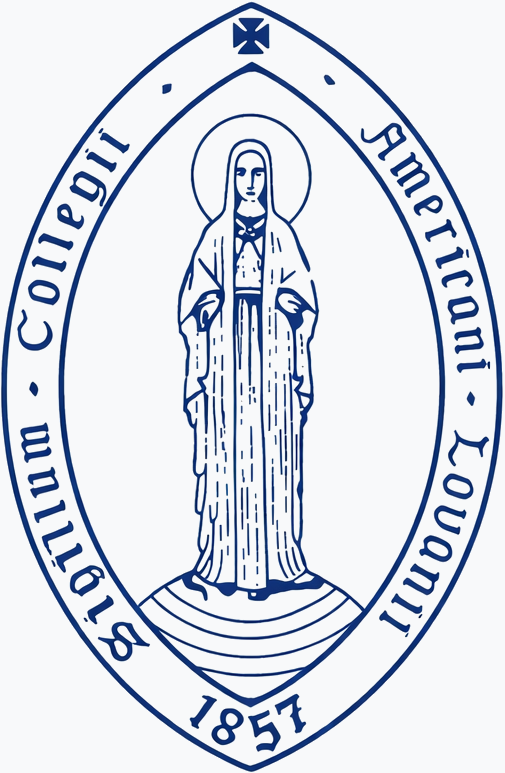
- A version of the seal of the former seminary
- Location: Naamsestraat 100, 3000 Leuven
- Latin name: Collegium Americanum Immaculatae Conceptionis Lovanii
- Founders: Martin John Spalding and Peter Paul Lefevere
- Established: 1857; 169 years ago
- Closed: 2011 (seminary)
- Named for: Immaculate Conception of Mary, mother of Jesus
- Former names: American College of the Immaculate Conception; American College of Louvain
- Status: Seminary closed; building renovated and reopened as a student residence by the KU Leuven.
- Rector: First rector: Peter Kindekens; Last rector: Kevin Codd
- Website: www.kuleuven.be/residenties/amerikaanscollege

The American College (Dutch: Amerikaans College) is a former Catholic seminary in Leuven, Belgium. It is now a student residence of the KU Leuven (KUL). Founded in 1857 as the American College of the Immaculate Conception, it was operated by United States Conference of Catholic Bishops (USCCB) to prepare European students to become deacons and priests for service in the United States, and to provide a residence for U.S. clergy studying at the Catholic University of Louvain and its two successor institutions, the KU Leuven (KUL) and the UCLouvain. The seminary closed in June 2011 due to low enrollment and a faculty shortage.

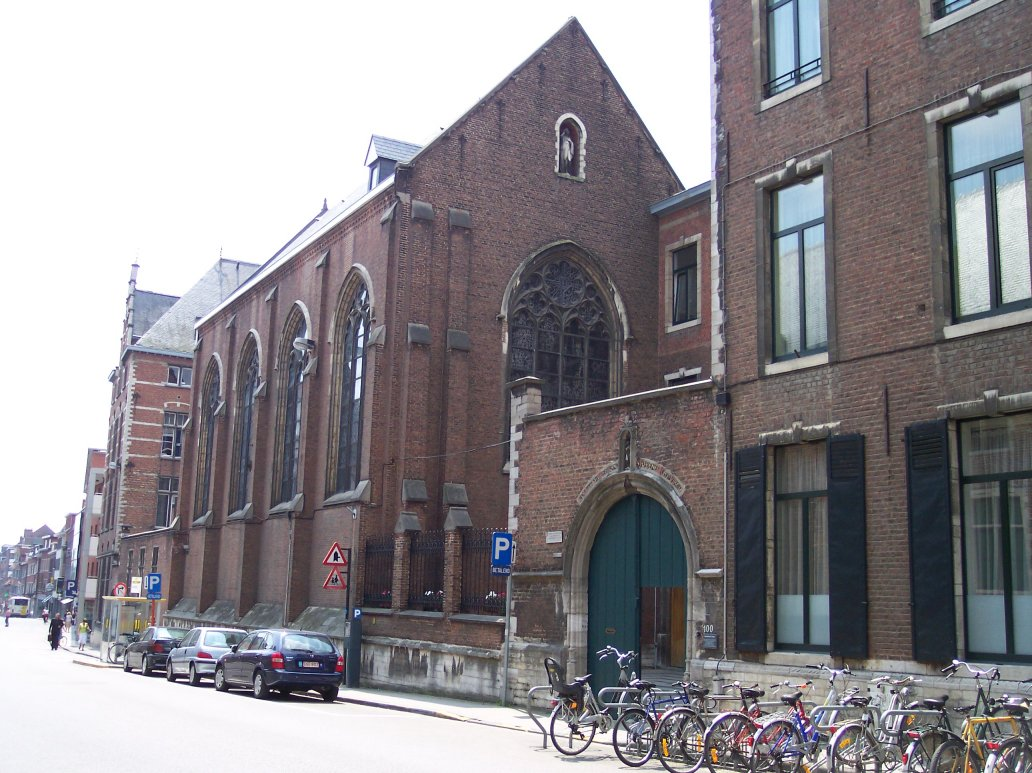
Former American College from Naamsestraat

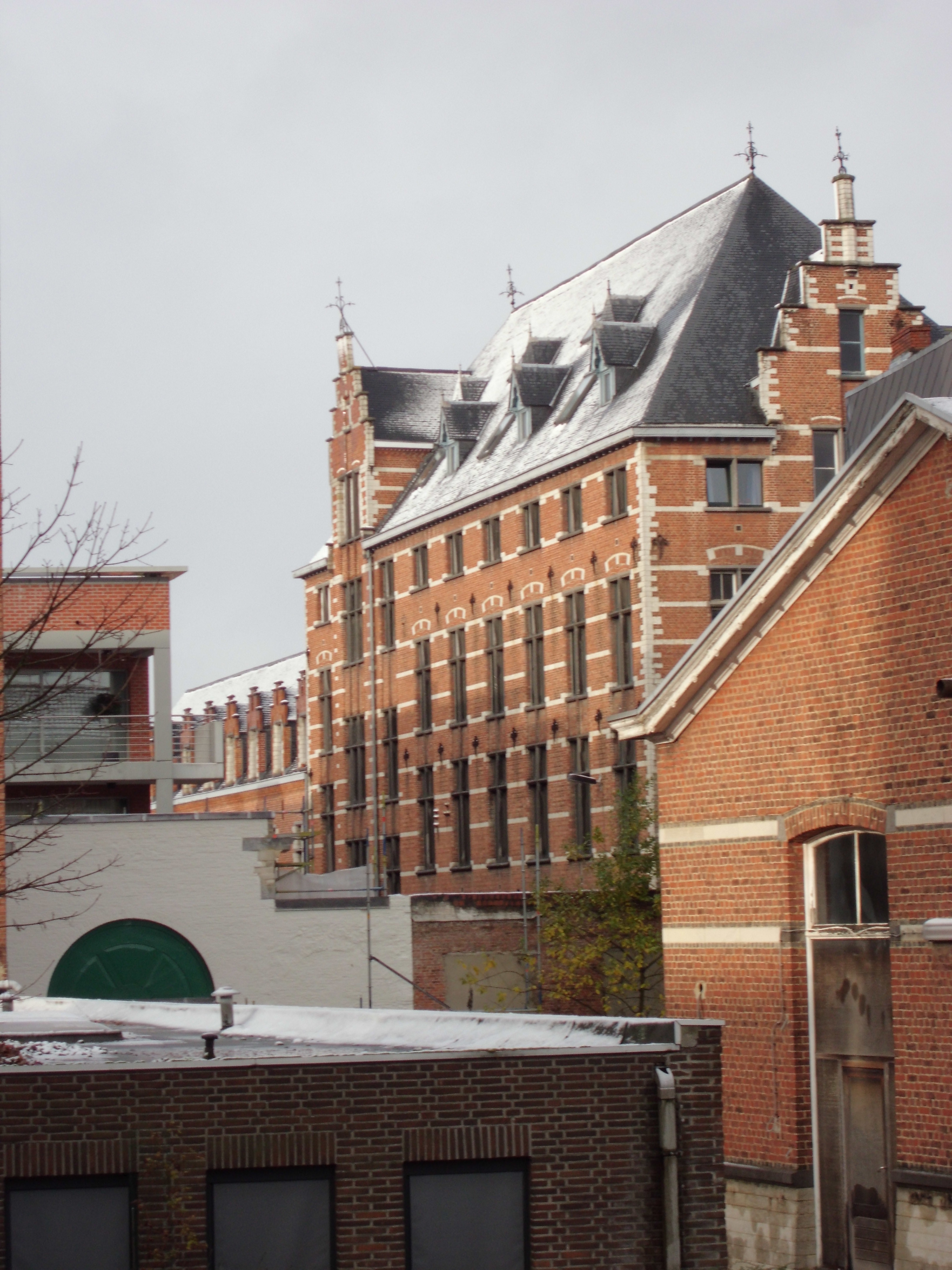
Former American College, Louvain

== History ==
=== 19th century ===
The American College was founded in 1857 by U.S. bishops under the leadership of Bishop Martin J. Spalding of Archdiocese of Louisville and Bishop Peter Paul Lefevere of Archdiocese of Detroit. It was created to train young European men to serve as missionary priests in North America and to give U.S. seminarians the opportunity to study at the Catholic University of Louvain. The college's signature song was a Marian hymn, O Sodales, authored by Gustave Limpens in 1862.

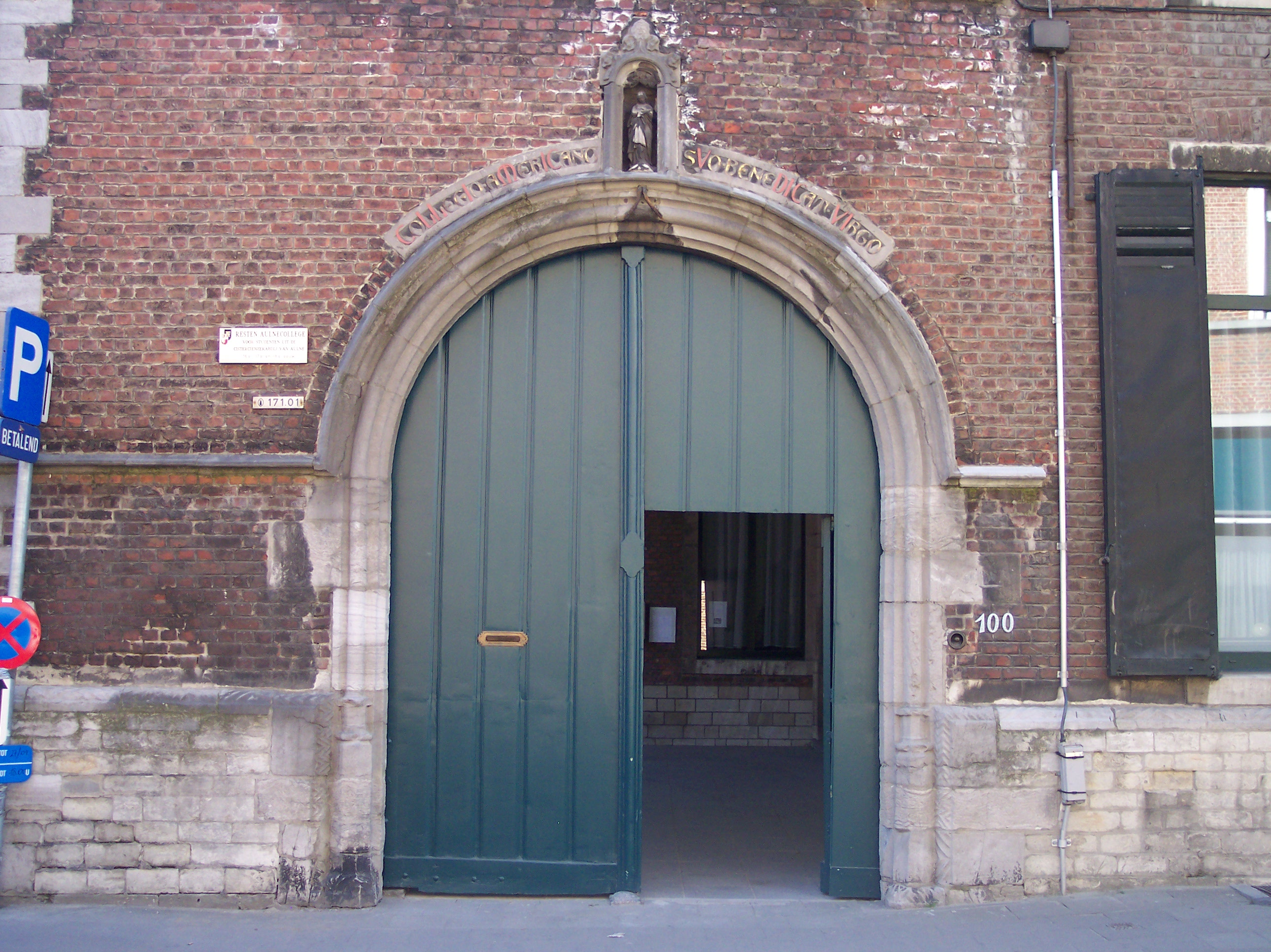
The front gate of the former American College, containing stonework from the college's predecessor, Aulnecollege

The College grew rapidly in its early years, most notably under the rectorship of John De Neve, its second rector. Over 800 priests trained at the American College served in dioceses and vicariates during the second half of the 19th century across the United States. Some of the priests were eventually appointed as bishops of newly formed dioceses:

- Bishop Charles John Seghers, founder of the Alaska mission
- Bishop Patrick Riordan of the Archdiocese of San Francisco
- Bishop Alphonse Glorieux of the Diocese of Boise
- Bishop John Baptist Brondel of the Diocese of Helena

=== 20th century ===
The college continued to train young men for service to the Church in the United States into the twentieth century under the rectorship of Jules De Becker. it remained open during German occupation in First World War. The college staff hid many documents and other valuable items of Leuven, including the statue of the Sedes Sapientiae, The staff converted the college into an emergency hospital and dispensary of food and clothing. At its peak, the college was assisting 1,500 Leuven residents per day.

With the declaration of war in 1939, the college closed. It reopened in 1952 under the rectorship of Father Thomas Maloney. The college expanded to accommodate the increased number of U.S. priests and brothers wanting to study at the Catholic University. It also began offering sabbatical opportunities for priests, religious, and lay ecclesial ministers from all nations.

In 1965, Leo Jozef Suenens, Archbishop of Mechelen-Brussels, invited the college to assume pastoral responsibility for a mooted "American parish" in the environs of Brussels. Consequently, on December 4th of that year, Albion Bulger, vice-rector of the college, was formally appointed pastor of Our Lady of Mercy Parish in Uccle. This gave anglophone Catholics access to Mass in their own vernacular, a phenomenon then growing significantly in prominence as a consequence of the liturgical reforms of the Second Vatican Council. The parish quickly emerged as a center for multinational anglophone Catholic life in the Brussels area.

In 1968, a major ethnic dispute known as the Leuven crisis erupted in Belgium between the Flemish-speaking population and the Walloons (French speakers). To resolve the dispute, the Catholic University of Louvain was split into KU Leuven in Leuven and the Université catholique de Louvain (UCLouvain) in Louvain-la-Neuve, Belgium. The American College, remaining in Leuven, maintained ties with both new institutions.

== Sponsorship and governorship ==
The American College was sponsored and overseen by U.S. Catholic bishops through the USCCB. The other U.S.-sponsored college in Europe was the Pontifical North American College in Rome.

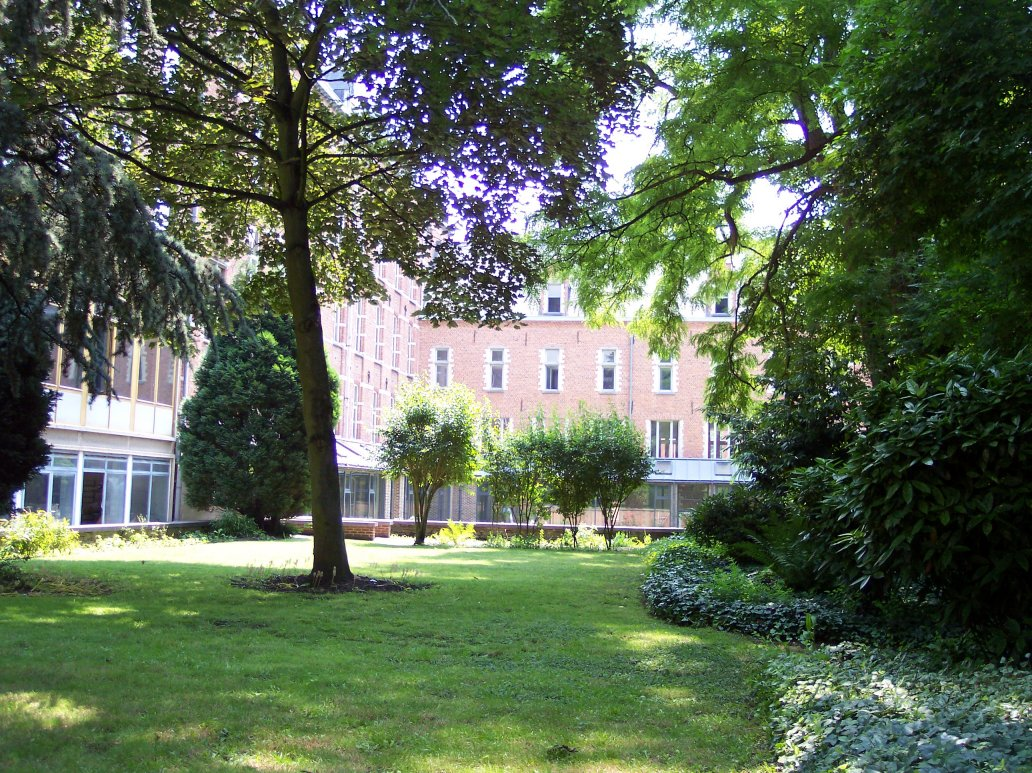
The grounds of the American College. The college's main building is visible through the trees.

The college was overseen by the Committee for the American College, its board of directors. Fourteen U.S. bishops sat on the committee; the last committee chair was Bishop David Ricken of the Diocese of Green Bay. The college also had an advisory board of lay persons and clergy.

At the close of the 2010–2011 academic year, there were nineteen seminarians in formation with the college. Their sponsoring dioceses were: Boise, Cheyenne, Congregation of Holy Cross, Green Bay, Lublin, Madison, Milwaukee, Orange, Portland (Oregon), Rochester, Salford, and Spokane.

== Mission ==
The primary mission of the American College was the formation of priests who would serve the Catholic Church in North America. In addition to the classes offered by KU Leuven the College provided a comprehensive program of human, spiritual, intellectual, and pastoral formation for seminarians.

The college also hosted graduate students studying canon law and theology in Leuven. The college ran a semester-long sabbatical program for priests, religious, or laity sent by their dioceses or religious congregations. Both the graduate students and sabbaticals took classes through KU Leuven while living at and participating in activities at the college.

The priests and seminarians of the college also played an important role in the pastoral care of English-speaking Catholics in Belgium. In addition to its ministry at the parish of Our Lady of Mercy in Uccle, in Leuven a lay community emerged around the sacraments celebrated at the college. Its closure, combined with the continuing growth of the international population in Leuven, meant that new provisions for the pastoral needs of this community were necessary. This resulted in the establishment within the pastoral zone of Leuven of an international Catholic community at Sint-Kwintenskerk, using English as its liturgical and working language.

== Closure ==
On November 22, 2010, the USCCB released a statement:

"Due to the small number of seminarians and available priest faculty, the American College of the Immaculate Conception in Leuven, Belgium, has announced its closure in June 2011."

On August 19, 2011, the USCCB, the American College board, KU Leuven and UCLouvain signed an agreement on the future use of the American College property. The facility was renovated in 2013 to serve as housing for Mater Dei and the St. Damien Community students, and for American researchers studying philosophy, theology and canon law at KU Leuven and UCLouvain.

== Student Residence ==
The American College currently operates as student residence under the Central Services Residences Coordination (CERAB) office of the KUL, with 141 rooms and 17 studio apartments accommodating approximately 180 students. It is designated an unsubsidized residence, meaning that room prices are determined based on market forces. Residents are a mixture of Belgian and international students. Students are organized into hallways, each of which is named for a notable American. Social events are organized by a student-run praesidium. Additionally, the College houses two autonomous groups of students: The Saint Damien Community, and a community within the network of the University Parish of the KU Leuven. When the College reopened in 2014 it also contained the Mater Dei Community for priests studying at the KUL. This community is no longer active.

=== Damien Community ===
The Saint Damien Community is a Catholic intentional community managed as a joint initiative of the KUL, the USCCB, UCLouvain, and the Belgian Bishops' Conference. As part of the agreement for the retrocession of the buildings and grounds of the college to the KUL in 2011, it was decided that the American College would contain a body of U.S. students and researchers in the fields of theology, philosophy, and canon law based either at the KUL or the UCLouvain. This was intended to recognize and maintain the College's historical ties with U.S. Catholicism. The Community has been in operation since the College's reopening as a student residence in the 2014-2015 academic year. It was envisioned as part of a broader Saint Damien Project, including a sabbatical program for visiting clergy and scholars and a summer residential program. It is financially supported by the Peter Kindekens Fund, named for the first rector of the seminary, and overseen by a project board consisting of representatives from its sponsor organizations. Helder De Schutter, dean of the Institute of Philosophy at the KUL, is the current president of the project board. It is named for Damien De Veuster, a Flemish missionary to Hawaiʻi and Catholic saint who entered the Congregation of the Sacred Hearts at their house in Leuven and undertook studies there; his tomb is also located in Leuven, at the Sint-Antoniuskapel.

In addition to its residential function, the Community maintains a chaplaincy which offers pastoral care to both residents of the American College and English speakers in Leuven. It also organizes an annual academic conference focusing on topics of interdisciplinary interest to philosophical and theological research.

== Chapels ==
=== Chapel of the Immaculate Conception ===
The Chapel of the Immaculate Conception was built to a neo-Gothic design by the East Flemish priest Petrus Van Loo in 1892–1893, during John Willemsen's tenure as rector. The current stained-glass windows, in a modern style, were designed by Roger Daniels and installed between 1961 and 1970, replacing the chapel's original windows, which were typical exemplars of the style sulpicien favored in Catholic devotional art of the second half of the nineteenth century. In 2021, the Flemish government awarded a grant of 58,347.31 euros for the restoration of the chapel's facades.

The Saint Damien Community regularly celebrates Catholic Mass and evening prayer in the chapel. It is also has an ecumenical function, hosting the services of St. Martha's and St. Mary's, a parish of the Anglican Diocese in Europe, as well as St. James the Apostle, part of the Diocese of UK-Europe and Africa in the Malankara Orthodox Syrian Church.

=== De Becker Memorial Chapel ===
The De Becker Memorial Chapel is a small whitewashed structure at the back of the college garden. Dated to 1734 on the basis of an inscription preserved in the wall of the chapel, it is the only intact structure which remains from the Aulnecollege. It was built in the style Régence characteristic of early Rococo architecture. Its current name is a consequence of a later rededication in honor of Jules De Becker, rector of the college from 1891 until 1931, commemorated by a memorial inscription.

== Rectors ==
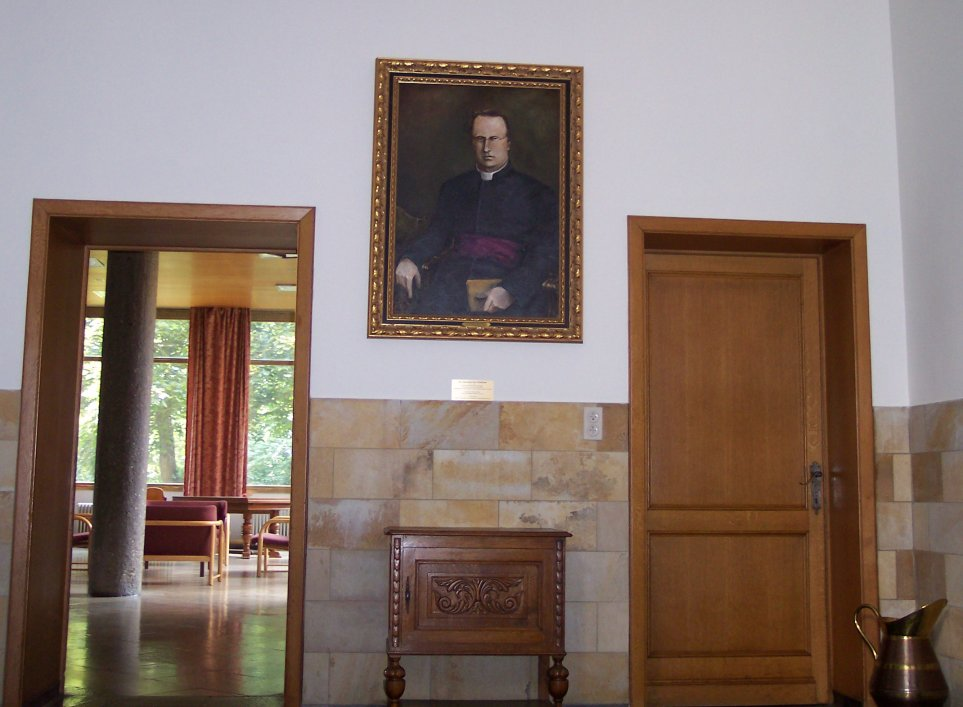
The front foyer of the American College. The painting of Peter Kindekens, the college's founding rector, greets visitors to the seminary.

- Peter Kindekens, Archdiocese of Detroit, 1857-1860
- John De Neve, Archdiocese of Detroit, 1860-1891
- John Willemsen, Archdiocese of Mechelen, 1891-1898
- Jules De Becker, Archdiocese of Mechelen, 1898-1931
- Pierre de Strycker, Archdiocese of Mechelen, 1931-1939
- Thomas Francis Maloney, Diocese of Providence, 1952-1960
- Paul D. Riedl, Diocese of Springfield, 1960-1970
- Clement E. Pribil, Archdiocese of Oklahoma City, 1970-1971
- Raymond Francis Collins, Diocese of Providence, 1971-1978
- William J. Greytak, Diocese of Helena, 1978-1983
- John J. Costanzo, Diocese of Pueblo, 1983-1988
- Thomas P. Ivory, Archdiocese of Newark, 1988-1992
- Melvin T. Long, Diocese of Salina, 1992-1993
- David E. Windsor, Congregation of the Mission, 1993-2001
- Kevin A. Codd, Diocese of Spokane, 2001-2007
- Ross A. Shecterle, Archdiocese of Milwaukee, 2007-2011

== Episcopal alumni ==
Over the years, a number of graduates of the American College have been appointed to the episcopacy. Bishop-alumni of the college include:

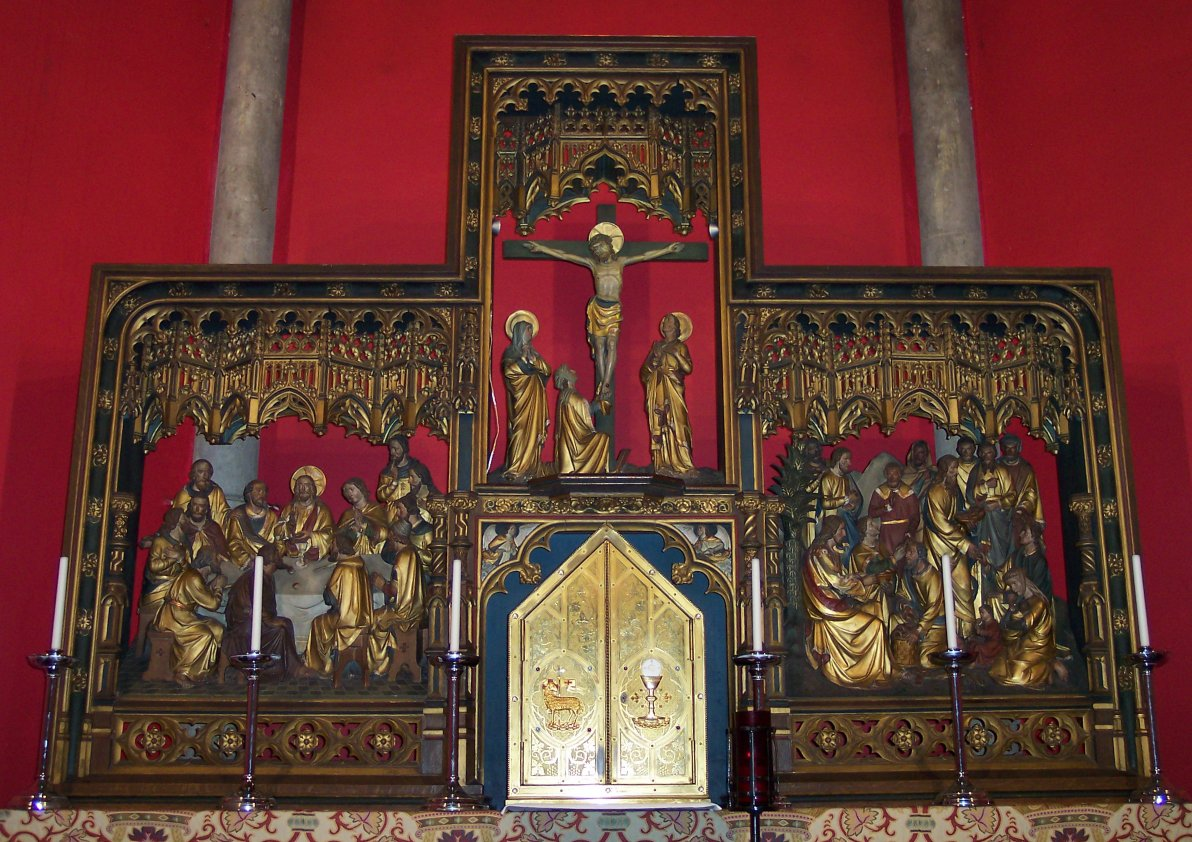
The reredos of the American College's chapel of the Immaculate Conception.

- Matthew Francis Brady (1893-1959), Bishop of Burlington (1938-1944) and Bishop of Manchester (1944-1959)
- Edward Kenneth Braxton (°1944), Auxiliary Bishop of St. Louis (1995-2001), Bishop of Lake Charles (2001-2005), and Bishop of Belleville (2005-2020)
- Jean-Baptiste Brondel (1842-1903), Bishop of Vancouver Island (1879-1883) and Bishop of Helena (1884-1903)
- Ferdinand Brossart (1849-1930), Bishop of Covington (1915-1923)
- Charles Albert Buswell (1913-2008), Bishop of Pueblo (1959-1979)
- Alphonse Liguori Chaupa (1959-2016), Auxiliary Bishop of Rabaul (2000-2003) and Bishop of Kimbe, Papua New Guinea (2003-2008)
- Francis Joseph Christian (°1942), Auxiliary Bishop of Manchester (1996–2018)
- Edmund Michael Dunne (1864-1929), Bishop of Peoria (1909-1929)
- Shelton Joseph Fabre (°1963), Auxiliary Bishop of New Orleans (2006-2013), Bishop of Houma-Thibodaux (2013–2022) and Archbishop of Louisville (2022–Present)
- Joseph John Fox (1855-1915), Bishop of Green Bay (1904-1915)
- Alphonse Joseph Glorieux (1844-1917), Vicar Apostolic of Idaho (1884-1893) and Bishop of Boise (1893-1917)
- Charles Pasquale Greco (1894-1987), Bishop of Alexandria (1946-1973)
- Francis Janssens (1843-1897), Bishop of Natchez (1881-1888) and Archbishop of New Orleans (1888-1897)
- Egidius Junger (1833-1895), Bishop of Nesqually (1879-1895)
- Jean-Nicolas Lemmens (1850-1897), Bishop of Victoria (1888-1897)
- Stephen Aloysius Leven (1905-1983), Auxiliary Bishop of San Antonio (1956-1969) and Bishop of San Angelo (1969-1979)
- Camillus Paul Maes (1846-1915), Bishop of Covington (1885-1915)
- Thomas Francis Maloney (1903-1962), sixth rector of the American College and Auxiliary Bishop of Providence (1960-1962)
- Russell Joseph McVinney (1898-1971), Bishop of Providence (1948-1971), influential in reopening the college in 1952
- Theophile Meerschaert (1847-1924), Bishop of Oklahoma (1891-1924)
- Robert Edward Mulvee (1930-2018), Bishop of Wilmington (1985-1995) and Bishop of Providence
- Henry Joseph O'Brien (1896-1976), Archbishop of Hartford (1945-1968)
- John Joseph O'Connor (1855-1927), Bishop of Newark (1901-1927)
- Bertram Orth, Bishop of Victoria (1900-1908)
- David Laurin Ricken (°1952), Coadjutor Bishop of Cheyenne (1999-2001), Bishop of Cheyenne (2001-2008), and Bishop of Green Bay (2008-present)
- Patrick William Riordan (1841-1914), Archbishop of San Francisco (1884-1914)
- Charles-Jean Seghers (1839-1886), Bishop of Vancouver Island (1873-1878, 1884-1886), Archbishop of Oregon City (1880-1884), and "Apostle of Alaska"
- John Lancaster Spalding (1840-1916), Bishop of Peoria (1877-1908) and co-founder of The Catholic University of America
- William Stang (1854-1907), Bishop of Fall River (1904-1907)
- Augustine Van de Vyver (1844-1911), Bishop of Richmond (1889-1911)
- Edward Weisenburger (°1960), Bishop of Salina (2012–2017) and Bishop of Tucson (2017–present)
- Alexander Mieceslaus Zaleski (1906-1975), Bishop of Lansing (1965-1975)
