= North Solomon Islands =

Island group in Western Pacific

Coordinates: 6°14′40″S 155°23′02″E

The North Solomon Islands form a geographical area covering the more northerly group of islands in the Solomon Islands archipelago and includes Bougainville and Buka Islands, Choiseul, Santa Isabel, the Shortland Islands and Ontong Java Atoll. In 1885 Germany declared a protectorate over these islands forming the German Solomon Islands Protectorate. With the exception of Bougainville and Buka, these were transferred to the British Solomon Islands Protectorate in 1900. Bougainville and Buka continued under German administration until the outset of World War I, when they were transferred to Australia, and after the war, were formally passed to Australian jurisdiction under a League of Nations mandate.

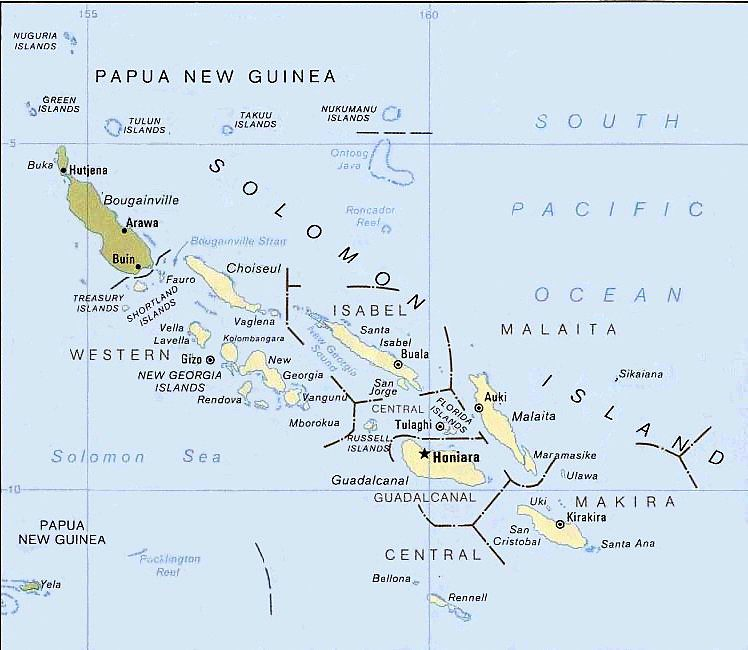
The Solomons archipelago.

Today, what were the North Solomon Islands are split between the Autonomous Region of Bougainville (Papua New Guinea) and the sovereign state of Solomon Islands. The latter gained independence in 1976 and succeeded the British Solomon Islands Protectorate known for decades before 1975 as the British Solomon Islands.

== History ==
On 17 February 1568, the Spanish explorer Alvaro de Mendaña y Neyra became the first European to sight the island, naming them Islas de Salomon.

In April 1885 a German protectorate (Schutzgebiet) was declared over the northern Solomon Islands: Bougainville, Buka, Choiseul, Santa Isabel and Ontong Java Atoll.

In June 1893, Captain Herbert Gibson of HMS Curacoa, declared the southern Solomon Islands of New Georgia, Guadalcanal, Malaita and San Cristobal a British protectorate, and this protectorate became known as the British Solomon Islands Protectorate. In 1898 Britain annexed the Santa Cruz and the Rennell and Bellona Islands.

In 1900, under the terms of the Treaty of Berlin (14 November 1899), Germany transferred Choiseul, Santa Isabel, the Shortlands and Ontong Java Atoll Islands to the British Solomon Islands Protectorate, but retained Bougainville and its surrounding islands. Germany granted this claim in exchange for the British giving up all claims to Western Samoa.

== Missions ==
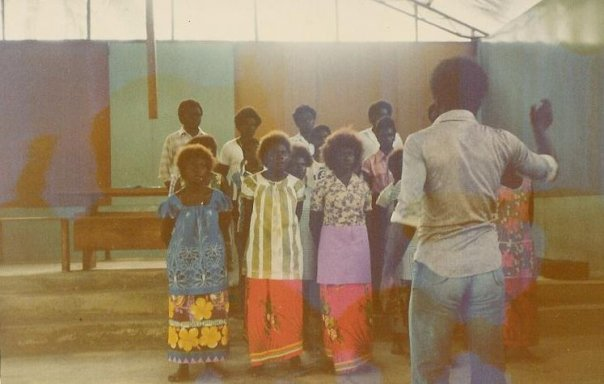
A United Church village choir in Siwai, Bougainville, 1978

The Roman Catholic "Apostolic prefecture of the Northern Solomon Islands" was established on 23 May 1898, by separation from the Apostolic Vicariate of New Pomerania, including the Islands of Ysabel, Choiseul, Bougainville and all the islets under German protectorate; until 1904, it was named Apostolic Prefecture of German Solomon Islands.

In 1897 the islands were put under the jurisdiction of Broyer, Apostolic Vicar of Samoa, and in 1898 formed into a new prefecture under Joseph Forestier, who resided at Kieta, on Bougainville Island. Fever was so prevalent at the mission that most of the priests who went to the islands in 1898 died from disease.

In 1911 the mission contained: 3 churches; 3 stations; 10 Marist Fathers; 5 lay brothers; 7 sisters of the Third Order of Mary; 2 Samoan catechists; 5 Catholic schools, with 140 pupils; 2 orphanages; and a few hundred Catholics. The Marist missionaries belonged to the province of Oceania, the superior of which resided at Sydney, New South Wales.

In 1930, it was promoted to Apostolic Vicariate of Northern Solomon Islands, from which the present Roman Catholic Diocese of Bougainville stems.
