= Henk Kronenberg =

Dutch Catholic priest (1934–2020)

Henk Kronenberg S.M.
- Bishop of Bougainville
- Church: Catholic Church
- Diocese: Diocese of Bougainville
- In office: 19 April 1999 – 15 December 2009
- Predecessor: Gregory Singkai
- Successor: Bernard Unabali

Orders
- Ordination: 18 October 1961
- Consecration: 14 July 1999 by Karl Hesse

Personal details
- Born: 29 September 1934 Enschede, Overijssel, Netherlands
- Died: 25 March 2020 (aged 85) Enschede, Overijssel, Netherlands

Henk Kronenberg (29 September 1934 – 25 March 2020) was a Dutch Roman Catholic bishop.

Kronenberg was born in the Netherlands and was ordained to the priesthood in 1961. He served as bishop of the Roman Catholic Diocese of Bougainville, Papua New Guinea from 1999 to 2009.
