= Diocese of Alotau-Sideia =

Latin Catholic diocese in Papua New Guinea

Coordinates: 10.3143°S 150.4570°E

Diocese of Alotau-Sideia Dioecesis Alotauna-Sideiana
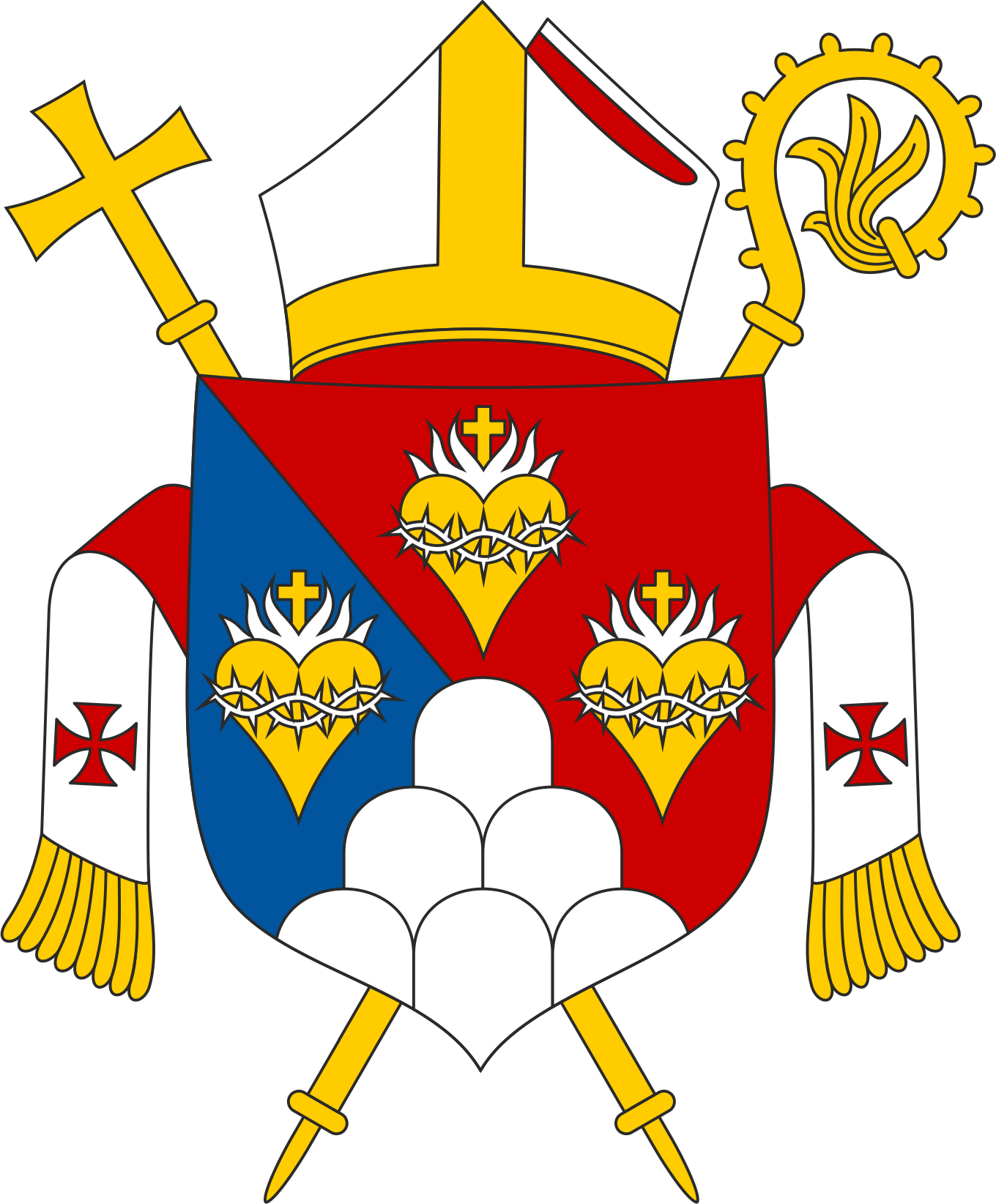
- Coat of arms of Diocese

Location
- Country: Papua New Guinea
- Metropolitan: Archdiocese of Port Moresby

Statistics
- Area: 20,000 km^{2} (7,700 sq mi)
- Population: Total; Catholics: (as of 2015); 294,919; 57,327 (19.4%)
- Parishes: 16

Information
- Denomination: Catholic Church
- Sui iuris church: Latin Church
- Rite: Roman Rite
- Established: 28 April 1975
- Cathedral: Sacred Heart of Jesus, Alotau, Milne Bay Province
- Patron saint: Sacred Heart of Jesus
- Secular priests: 25

Current leadership
- Pope: Leo XIV
- Bishop: Jacek Piotr Tendej, C.M., Bishop-elect
- Vicar General: Augustine Ha Vu, CM
- Bishops emeritus: Rolando C. Santos, C.M.

Website
- http://catholicdiocesealotau.com/

The Diocese of Alotau-Sideia is a Latin Catholic suffragan diocese in the ecclesiastical province of the Metropolitan Archdiocese of Port Moresby, yet remains dependent on the Roman Congregation for the Missions Propaganda Fide.

Its cathedral episcopal see is the Cathedral of the Sacred Heart of Jesus, in Alotau, Milne Bay Province.

== History ==
- It was erected as the Prefecture Apostolic of Samarai on 13 June 1946, on territory split off from the then Apostolic Vicariate of Papua.
- Promoted on 11 November 1956 as Vicariate Apostolic of Samarai, hence entitled to a titular bishop.
- Promoted on 15 November 1966 as Diocese of Sideia, ceasing to be an exempt pre-diocesan mission.
- Its name was changed to the Diocese of Alotau-Sideia on 28 April 1975 (after the provincial capital transfer to Alotau).

== Ordinaries ==
(all Roman Rite, so far missionary members of Latin congregations)

Apostolic Prefects of Samarai

- Apostolic Administrator André Sorin, Sacred Heart Missionaries (M.S.C.) (1946.06.13 – 1951.05.18), Titular Bishop of Antiphræ (1946.06.13 – 1959.04.19), while Apostolic Vicar of Port Moresby (Papua New Guinea) (1946.06.13 – 1959.04.19)
- Francis John Doyle, M.S.C. (1951.05.18 – 1956.11.11 see below)

Apostolic Vicar of Samarai

- Francis John Doyle, M.S.C. (see above 1956.11.11 – 1966.11.15 see below), Titular Bishop of Onuphis (1956.11.11 – 1966.11.15)

Diocesan Bishops of Sideia

- Francis John Doyle, M.S.C. (6.11.15 – 1970.03.07); emeritate as Titular Bishop of Árd Carna (1970.03.07 – 1973.11.04)
- Desmond Charles Moore, M.S.C. (1970.03.07 – 1975.04.28 see below)

Diocesan Bishops of Alotau-Sideia

- Desmond Charles Moore, M.S.C. (see above 1975.04.28 – retired 2001.06.25)
- Francesco Panfilo, S.D.B. (2001.06.25 – 2010.03.18), also President of Bishops’ Conference of Papua New Guinea and Solomon Islands (2008.04 – 2011.05); later Coadjutor Archbishop of Rabaul (Papua New Guinea) (2010.03.18 – 2011.08.11) succeeding as Metropolitan Archbishop of Rabaul 2011.08.11 – ...)
- Rolando C. Santos, C.M. (2011.04.06 – retired 2025.07.07)
- Jacek Piotr Tendej, C.M. (appointed 2025.07.07 – ...)

== Sources and external links ==
- GCatholic, with incumbent biography links
