= Des Moore (bishop) =

Australian bishop (1926–2020)

The Most Reverend Desmond Moore
- Bishop of Alotau-Sideia
- Diocese: Alotau-Sideia
- Installed: 2 July 1970
- Term ended: 15 June 2001
- Predecessor: Francis John Doyle
- Successor: Francesco Panfilo

Orders
- Ordination: 27 July 1957
- Consecration: 2 July 1970 at St. Mary's Cathedral, Port Moresby by Virgil Patrick Copas

Personal details
- Born: Desmond Charles Moore; 12 May 1926 Thebarton, South Australia, Australia
- Died: 2 June 2020 (aged 94) Kensington, New South Wales, Australia
- Denomination: Catholic Church
- Occupation: Catholic bishop

Sir Desmond Charles Moore KBE (12 May 1926 – 2 June 2020) was an Australian prelate of the Roman Catholic Church.

== Early life ==
Moore was born in Thebarton, South Australia, on 12 May 1926, the fourth of five children born to Margaret Mary (Leahy] and Edwin John Moore. His father died when he was just seven years old. He grew up next to Hindmarsh, where the Missionaries of the Sacred Heart had been based since 1913. The priests of the order were a constant presence through his childhood. He attended Christian Brothers College, Adelaide.

After graduating high school, he worked as a banker for some years, before feeling drawn to the missionary life and the Missionaries of the Sacred Heart.

In 1948, he moved from Adelaide to Sydney to begin studies for the priesthood. He spent three years studying Latin, then spent a year in the novitiate before moving to Croydon, Victoria, to complete his studies.

== Priesthood ==
Moore was ordained a priest for the Missionaries of the Sacred Heart on 27 July 1957. His first appointment was in Douglas Park, where he was assistant to the novice master and bursar of the monastery. He served there until 1960, when he was sent to Papua New Guinea to begin missionary work.

His first 12 months in the country were spent in Port Moresby, where he worked with the bishop and parish priest. He became superior of the Missionaries of the Sacred Heart in Port Moresby and two years later, was posted to Milne Bay.

== Episcopate ==
On 7 March 1970, Moore was appointed Bishop of Alotau-Sideia, Papua New Guinea. He was consecrated at St. Mary's Cathedral, Port Moresby on 2 July 1970 by Archbishop Virgil Patrick Copas MSC.

As bishop of a diocese spanning 20,000 square kilometres, he often found himself working wherever he was needed. He could often be found on the wharf helping to load one of the mission boats, or organising the passengers and deck cargo. He would also travel around Alotau on a scooter.

He also began dialogue between Muslims and Catholics in the region, when he became friends with Sadiq Sandbach, a British convert to Islam.

He was appointed Knight Commander of the Order of the British Empire (KBE) in 1996.

== Retirement and death ==
Moore retired from episcopal ministry on 15 June 2001, having reached the canonical retirement age of 75. He consecrated his successor, Francesco Panfilo, on 8 September 2001.

On 2 June 2020, Moore died at St Joseph’s Nursing Home in Kensington, New South Wales, at the age of 94.
