= Diocese of Bougainville =

Latin Catholic diocese in Papua New Guinea

Coordinates: 5.4294°S 154.6710°E

Diocese of Bougainville Dioecesis Buganvillensis
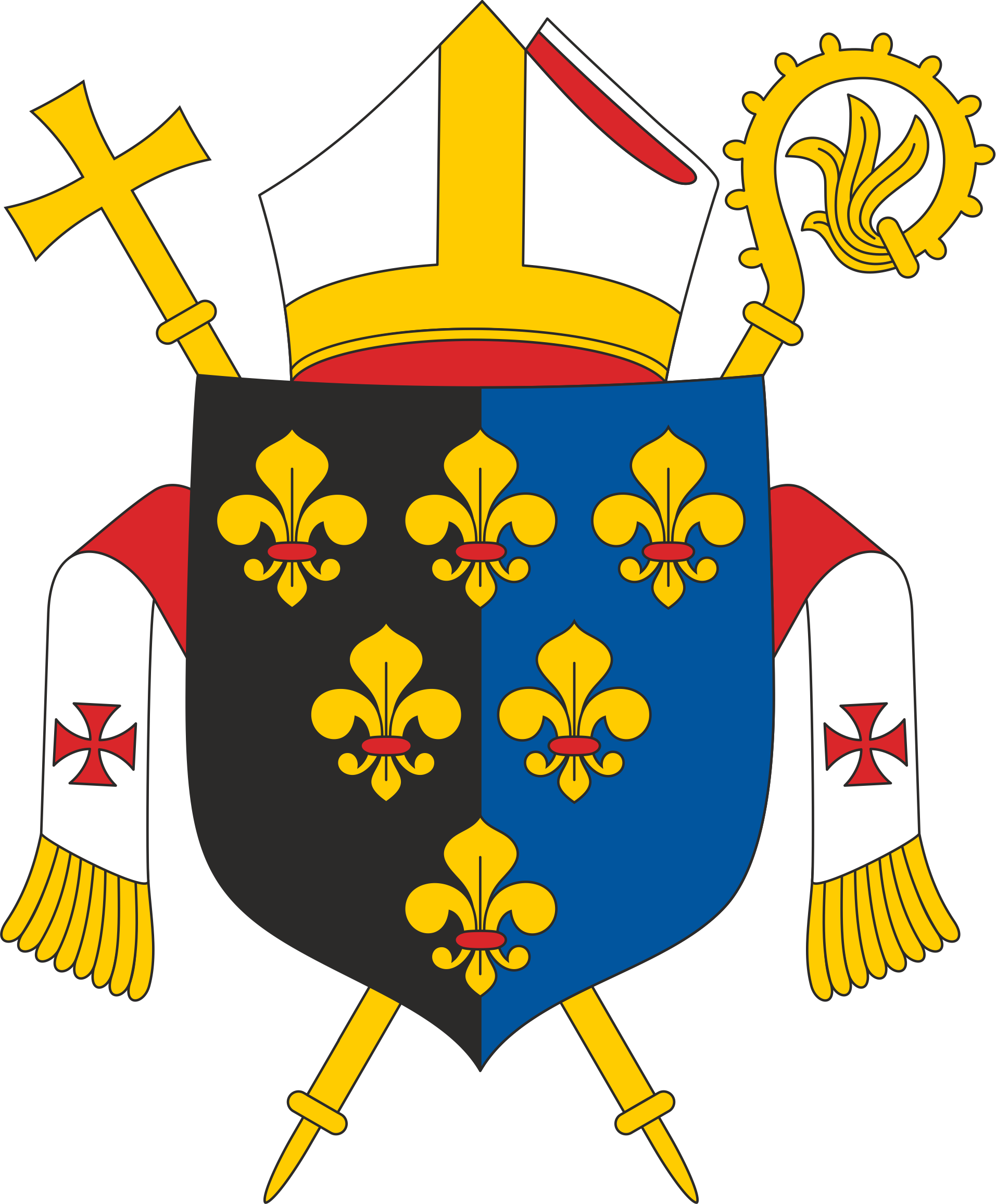
- Coat of arms

Location
- Country: Papua New Guinea
- Metropolitan: Archdiocese of Rabaul
- Headquarters: Buka, Bougainville, Papua New Guinea

Statistics
- Area: 10,660 km^{2} (4,120 sq mi)
- Population: Total; Catholics: (as of 2022); 337,000; 266,444 (79.1%)
- Parishes: 35

Information
- Denomination: Catholic Church
- Sui iuris church: Latin Church
- Rite: Roman Rite
- Established: 23 May 1898; 128 years ago
- Cathedral: Our Lady of the Assumption Cathedral, Buka
- Secular priests: 35 (23 Diocesan, 12 Religious Orders)

Current leadership
- Pope: Leo XIV
- Bishop: Dariusz Kałuża, M.S.F.
- Metropolitan Archbishop: Rochus Tatamai, M.S.C.

The Diocese of Bougainville is a Latin Catholic suffragan diocese of the Archdiocese of Rabaul. The diocesan cathedral is the Our Lady of the Assumption Cathedral, Buka. It was previously the Church of St. Michael the Archangel at the former Tubiana mission.

== History ==
- 23 May 1898: Erected as the Prefecture Apostolic of German Solomon Islands
- 21 January 1904: Renamed Prefecture Apostolic of Northern Solomon Islands
- 31 May 1930: Elevated to Vicariate Apostolic of Northern Solomon Islands
- 15 November 1966: Elevated further to Diocese of Bougainville

== Leadership ==
=== Prefect of German Solomon Islands ===
- Giuseppe Forestier, S.M. (1898 – 21 January 1904 see below)

=== Prefects of Northern Solomon Islands ===
- Giuseppe Forestier, S.M. (see above 21 January 1904 – 1918)
- Maurice Boch, S.M. (18 May 1920 – 31 May 1930 see below)

=== Vicars Apostolic of Northern Solomon Islands ===
- Maurice Boch, S.M. (see above 31 May 1930 – 9 June 1930), resigned
- Thomas James Wade, S.M. (3 July 1930 – 14 June 1960), resigned
- Leo Lemay, S.M. (14 June 1960 – 15 November 1966 see below)

=== Bishops of Bougainville ===
- Leo Lemay, S.M. (see above 15 November 1966 – 1 July 1974), resigned
- Gregory Singkai (1 July 1974 – 12 September 1996)
  - Apostolic Administrator Karl Hesse, M.S.C. (16 June 1995 – 12 September 1996), Archbishop of Rabaul
- Henk Kronenberg, S.M. (19 April 1999 – 15 December 2009), retired
- Bernard Unabali (15 December 2009 – 10 August 2019)
  - Apostolic Administrator Francesco Panfilo, S.D.B. (13 August 2019 – 15 November 2020), Archbishop of Rabaul
- Dariusz Kałuża, M.S.F. (12 September 2020 – Present)

=== Auxiliary bishop ===
- Bernard Unabali (2006-2009), appointed Bishop here

=== Other priest of this diocese who became bishop ===
- Peter Kurongku (1966-1978), appointed Auxiliary Bishop of Honiara in 1978

== External links and references ==
- "Diocese of Bougainville". Catholic-Hierarchy.
- "Bishop Bernard Unabali". Catholic-Hierarchy.
