= Alphonse Liguori Chaupa =

Roman Catholic bishop in Papua New Guinea

- Bishop of Kimbe
- Church: Catholic Church
- Diocese: Diocese of Kimbe
- In office: 4 July 2003 – 19 January 2008
- Predecessor: Diocese erected
- Successor: William Fey
- Previous posts: Titular Bishop of Turris Tamalleni (2000-2003); Auxiliary Bishop of Rabaul (2000-2003)

Orders
- Ordination: 10 January 1987
- Consecration: 30 September 2000 by Karl Hesse

Personal details
- Born: 26 July 1959 Uvol (in Cape Dampier), New Britain, Territory of Papua and New Guinea, Australia
- Died: 21 March 2016 (aged 56)

Alphonse Liguori Chaupa (27 July 1959 – 21 March 2016) was a Roman Catholic bishop.

Ordained to the priesthood in 1987, Chaupa was named auxiliary bishop of the Roman Catholic Archdiocese of Rabaul, Papua New Guinea. From 2003 until 2008, Chaupa then served as bishop of the Roman Catholic Diocese of Kimbe, Papua New Guinea.
