= Rolando Santos =

Filipino Catholic bishop

Rolando Crisostomo Santos C.M.
- Bishop Emeritus of Alotau-Sideia
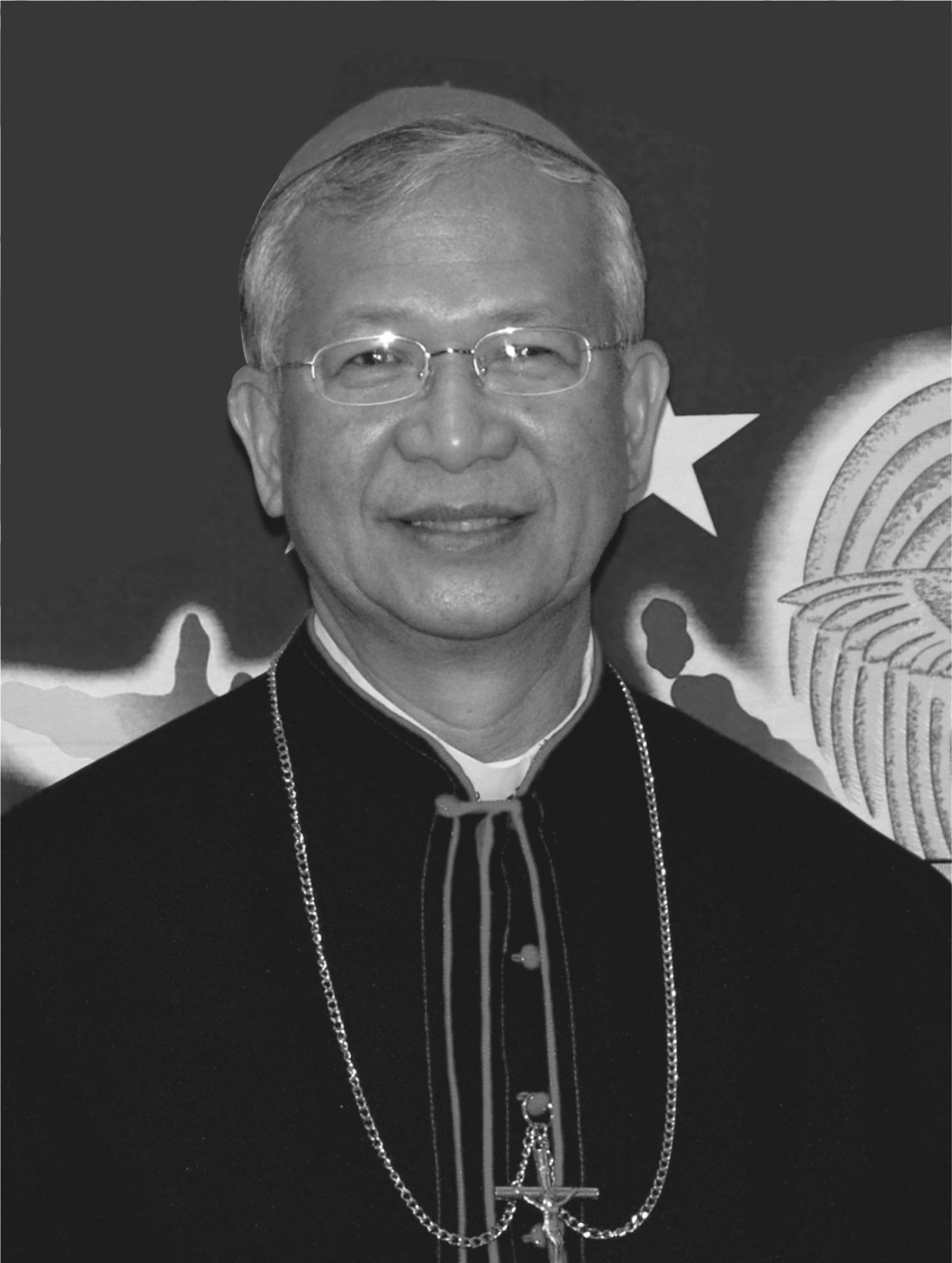
- Church: Catholic Church
- Diocese: Diocese of Alotau-Sideia
- In office: 6 April 2011 – 7 July 2025
- Predecessor: Francesco Panfilo
- Successor: Jacek Tendej
- Other post: Apostolic Administrator of Alotau-Sideia (2025)

Orders
- Ordination: 1 June 1974
- Consecration: 3 July 2011 by Francesco Panfilo

Personal details
- Born: 21 March 1949 (age 77) Malabon, Rizal, Philippines

Rolando Crisostomo Santos (born 21 March 1949, in Malabon) is a Filipino clergyman and Bishop Emeritus of Alotau-Sideia. He was appointed bishop in 2011.
