= Ambrose Kiapseni =

Papua New Guinean Roman Catholic bishop (1945–2019)

Ambrose Kiapseni M.S.C.
- Bishop of Kavieng
- Church: Catholic Church
- Diocese: Diocese of Kavieng
- In office: 21 January 1991 – 22 June 2018
- Predecessor: Karl Hesse
- Successor: Rochus Tatamai

Orders
- Ordination: 7 January 1975
- Consecration: 12 May 1991 by Karl Hesse

Personal details
- Born: 16 October 1945 Masahet Island (part of the Lihir Group), mandatory Territory of New Guinea, Australia, British Empire
- Died: 20 December 2019 (aged 74) Kopkop, New Ireland Province, Papua New Guinea

Ambrose Kiapseni M.S.C., CMG (16 October 1945 – 20 December 2019) was a Roman Catholic bishop in Papua New Guinea. Kiapseni was bishop of the Diocese of Kavieng, ordained on 12 May 1991, and resigned on 22 June 2018.

Kiapseni was born in Masahet Island, Lihir Islands, Territory of New Guinea, and was officially ordained a Roman Catholic priest on 7 January 1975. He was a member of the Missionaries of the Sacred Heart religious order. He was appointed to Kavieng by Pope John Paul II on 21 January 1991.

Ambrose Kiapseni was awarded the title of Companion of the Order of St Michael and St George for services to the Roman Catholic Church as the Bishop of Kavieng in June 2009. as part of the 2009 Birthday Honours.
