= William Fey =

American priest (1942–2021)

William Fey OFMCap
- Bishop of Kimbe
- Church: Catholic Church
- Diocese: Diocese of Kimbe
- In office: June 8, 2010 – October 18, 2019
- Predecessor: Alphonse Liguori Chaupa
- Successor: John Bosco Auram

Orders
- Ordination: 19 October 1968 by Vincent Leonard
- Consecration: 9 October 2010 by Karl Hesse

Personal details
- Born: William Regis Fey; November 6, 1942 Pittsburgh, Pennsylvania, United States
- Died: January 19, 2021 (aged 78) Pittsburgh, Pennsylvania, United States
- Motto: BIKPELA EM I LAIT BILONG MI; Lingala for "Because he is the light for us"
- Coat of arms

Bishop William Regis Fey, OFMCap (November 6, 1942 – January 19, 2021) was an American Roman Catholic prelate.

== Biography ==
Fey was born in Pittsburgh, Pennsylvania, United States, on November 6, 1942. He made his first vows in the Capuchin order on July 14, 1963, and the perpetual vows on July 14, 1966. Fey was ordained a priest on October 19, 1968.

His superiors at the St. Augustine Province of the Capuchins sent him to Oxford University where he earned his DPhil. Oxeniensis in Philosophy. Fey taught at St. Fidelis Seminary College in Herman, Pennsylvania and Borromeo College in Wickliffe, Ohio before going to Papua New Guinea to teach philosophy in a seminary there. He left for two years to teach philosophy in Zambia, and then returned to Papua New Guinea. Fey was appointed bishop of the Roman Catholic Diocese of Kimbe, in Kimbe, Papua New Guinea, on June 8, 2010, and was ordained bishop on October 10 of that year. He made an Ad Limina visit to Pope Benedict XVI in Rome in June 2012.

He was working towards building a catechetical training center in his diocese, and he had been requested by the provincial government in New Britain to work with them on establishing a teacher's college. He and Cardinal Sean O'Malley, OFMCap, Archbishop of Boston, Massachusetts and Bishop Donald Francis Lippert, OFMCap, all began their religious lives with the St Augustine Province of Capuchins based in Pittsburgh, Pennsylvania.

Fey died from COVID-19 in Pittsburgh, on January 19, 2021, at the age of 78, amidst the COVID-19 pandemic in Pennsylvania.
