= Diocese of Kavieng =

Latin Catholic diocese in Papua New Guinea

Coordinates: 2.5832°S 150.7918°E

Diocese of Kavieng Dioecesis Kaviengensis
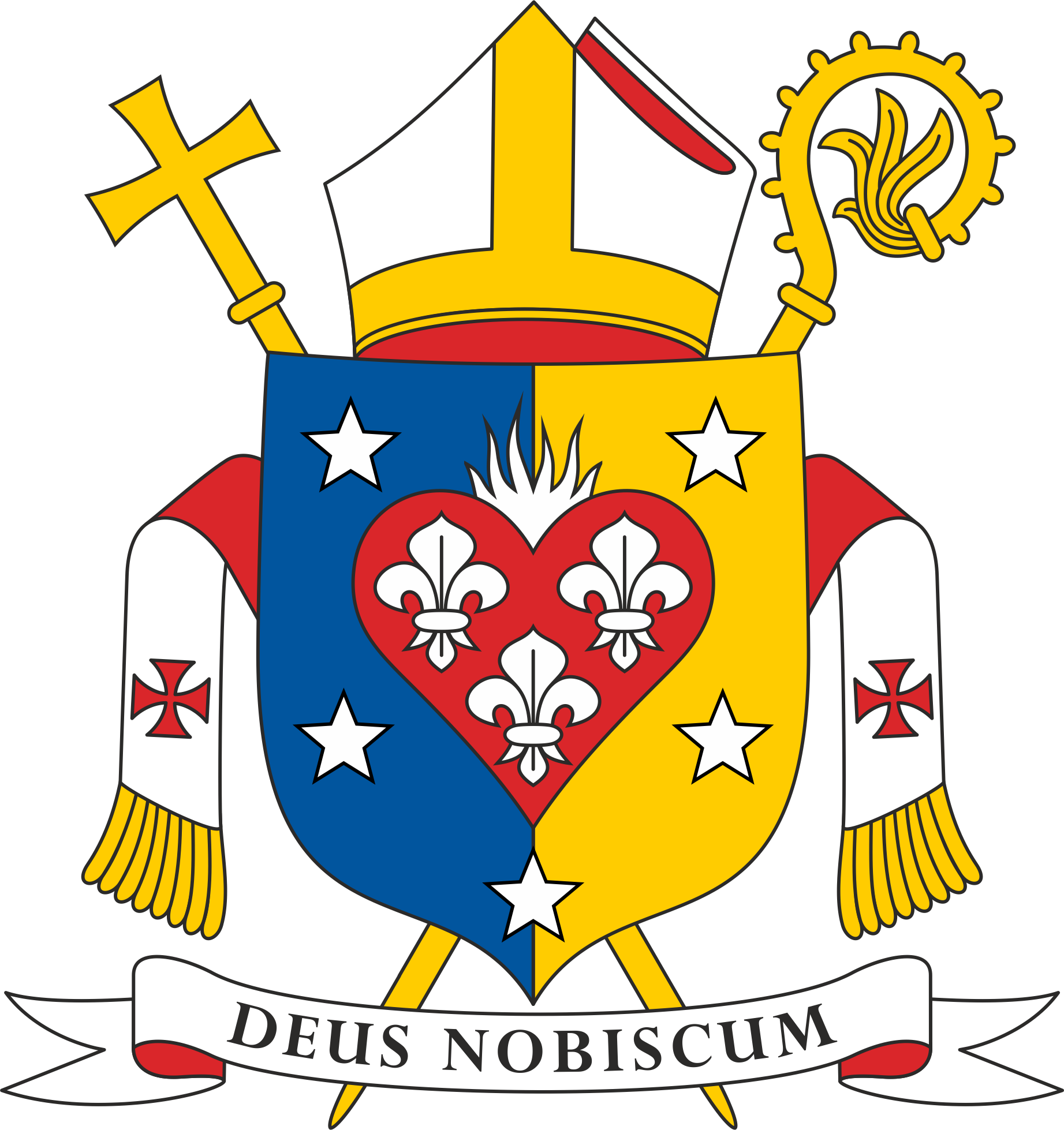
- Coat of arms

Location
- Country: Papua New Guinea
- Metropolitan: Archdiocese of Rabaul
- Headquarters: Kavieng, New Ireland Province, Papua New Guinea

Statistics
- Area: 23,000 km^{2} (8,900 sq mi)
- Population: Total; Catholics: (as of 2023); 221,000; 115,000 (52.0%)
- Parishes: 20

Information
- Denomination: Catholic Church
- Sui iuris church: Latin Church
- Rite: Roman Rite
- Established: 5 July 1957; 69 years ago
- Secular priests: 19 (all Diocesan)

Current leadership
- Pope: Leo XIV
- Bishop: Roland Vunuvung
- Metropolitan Archbishop: Rochus Tatamai, M.S.C.

The Diocese of Kavieng is a Latin Catholic suffragan diocese of the Archdiocese of Rabaul. It was erected Vicariate Apostolic in 1957 and elevated to a diocese in 1966.

== Ordinaries ==
Vicar Apostolic of Kavieng (Roman Rite)

- Alfred Matthew Stemper, M.S.C. (5 July 1957 – 15 November 1966 see below)

Bishops of Kavieng (Roman Rite)

- Alfred Matthew Stemper, M.S.C. (see above 15 November 1966 – 24 August 1980), resigned
- Karl Hesse, M.S.C. (24 October 1980 – 7 July 1990), appointed Archbishop of Rabaul
- Ambrose Kiapseni, M.S.C. (21 January 1991 – 22 June 2018), resigned
- Rochus Tatamai, M.S.C. (22 June 2018 – 19 June 2020), appointed Archbishop of Rabaul
  - Apostolic Administrator Rochus Tatamai, M.S.C. (29 September 2020 – 15 August 2023)
- Roland Vunuvung (24 June 2023 – Present)

== External links and references ==
- "Diocese of Kavieng". Catholic-Hierarchy.
