= Apostolic prefecture =

Missionary area not yet developed enough to become a diocese

An apostolic prefect or prefect apostolic is a priest who heads what is known as an apostolic prefecture, a 'pre-diocesan' missionary jurisdiction where the Catholic Church is not yet sufficiently developed to have it made a diocese. Although it usually has an (embryonal) see, it is often not called after such city but rather after a natural feature, or administrative geographical area, which may be a name in use by the local inhabitants, or one assigned by a colonial authority, depending on the circumstances under which the prefecture was established.

If a prefecture grows and flourishes, it may be elevated to an apostolic vicariate, headed by a titular bishop, in the hope that with time the region will generate enough Catholics and stability for its Catholic institutions, to warrant being established as a diocese. Both these stages remain missionary, hence exempt, that is, directly subject to the Holy See, specifically the Dicastery for Evangelization, rather than, as a diocese normally would, belong to an ecclesiastical province.

The full sequence of development is: independent mission, apostolic prefecture, apostolic vicariate, apostolic diocese; however steps may be skipped at the papal discretion, so the next steps may be bishopric or even archbishopric.

The apostolic prefecture and the apostolic vicariate are to be distinguished from the territorial abbacy (formerly called an "abbey nullius").

== History ==
During the last centuries of the second millennium it was the practice of the Holy See to govern either through prefects apostolic or apostolic vicariates, many territories where no dioceses with resident bishops were erected and where local circumstances, such as the character and customs of the people or hostility of civil powers, made it doubtful whether an episcopal see could be permanently established. The establishing of a prefecture apostolic in a place supposes that the Church has attained only a small development in the area. Fuller growth leads to the foundation of an apostolic vicariate as an intermediate stage to becoming a diocese.

"An apostolic vicariate or apostolic prefecture is a certain portion of the people of God which has not yet been established as a diocese due to special circumstances and which, to be shepherded, is entrusted to an apostolic vicar or apostolic prefect who governs it in the name of the Supreme Pontiff." Can. 371 §1.

A prefect apostolic is of lower rank than a vicar apostolic. The prefect's powers are more limited and do not normally possess the episcopal character, as is ordinarily the case with a vicar apostolic. The duties of a prefect apostolic consist in directing the work of the mission entrusted to his care; his powers are in general those necessarily connected with the ordinary administration of such an office, for instance: the assigning of missionaries and the making of regulations for the good management of the affairs of the mission.

Prefects apostolic govern independent territories and are subject only to the pope. When a vicariate or a diocese extended over a very large territory in which the Catholic population was unequally distributed, the Holy See sometimes placed a portion of the territory in charge of a prefect apostolic; in which case the faculties of the prefect were more limited, and in the exercise of his office he was supervised by the vicar apostolic or the diocesan bishop. With a view to better protecting the authority of the local vicar apostolic or bishop, it was proposed in the First Vatican Council to abolish prefects apostolic having jurisdiction over districts within a vicariate or diocese of the Latin Church, but the Council was interrupted and the practice continued until Pope Leo XIII abolished them within the Oriental Churches by a decree of Propaganda Fide on 12 September 1896, and established superiors with special dependence on the papal representatives of the areas concerned.

In 1911 there were 66 prefectures apostolic: 5 in Europe; 17 in Asia; 3 in North America (e.g., the Yukon); 11 in South America; 23 in Africa and 7 in Oceania.

As of 2024, the prefectures apostolic were only 38, of which the vast majority (28) were in China (many vacant), where development of the Catholic Church, including that of the prefectures, had long been hindered by actions of the government. The 10 other prefectures included a newly created one for Azerbaijan, 4 more in Asia, 3 in Africa, 1 in the Americas and 1 in Oceania.

== Current apostolic prefectures ==
=== In China ===
- Ankang 安康 (Hinganfu) / Ankang
- Baojing 保靖 / Paoking
- Guilin 桂林 / Kweilin
- Hainan 海南 / Hainan
- Haizhou 海州 / Haichow
- Jiamusi 佳木斯 / Kiamusze
- Jian′ou 建甌 / Kienow
- Lingling 零岭 / Yongzhou 永州 / Yungchow
- Linqing 臨清 / Lintsing
- Lintong 臨潼 / Lintung
- Lixian 澧縣 / Lizhou 澧州 / Lichow
- Qiqihar 齊齊哈爾 / Tsitsibar
- Shaowu 邵武 /
- Shashi 沙市 / Shasi
- Shiqian 石阡 / Shihtsien
- Suixian 隨縣 / Suihsien
- Tongzhou 同州 / Tungchow
- Tunxi 屯溪 / Tunki
- Weihai(wei) 威海衛 / Weihaiwei
- Xiangtan 湘潭 / Siangtan
- Xining 西寧 / Sining
- Xinjiang 新絳 / Jiangzhou 絳州 / Kiangchow
- Xinjiang-Urumqi 新疆-烏魯木齊 / Sinkiang
- Xinxiang 新鄉 / Sinsiang
- Yangzhou 揚州 / Yangchow
- Yixian 易縣 / Yihsien
- Yueyang 岳陽 / Yuezhou 岳州 / Yochow
- Zhaotong 昭通 / Chaotung

=== Elsewhere in Eurasia ===
- Battambang (បាត់ដំបង) in Cambodia
- Kampong Cham (កំពង់ចាម) in Cambodia
- Ulaanbaatar in Mongolia
- Yuzhno Sakhalinsk in Asian Russia and Japan
- Baku, in and covering Azerbaijan (raised to the level of prefecture on 4 August 2011; had been Mission sui iuris of Baku from 11 October 2006)

=== Americas ===
- Falkland Islands (U.K.)

=== Oceania ===
- Marshall Islands, not exempt but in the ecclesiastical province of Agana.

=== Africa ===
- Misurata, in Libya
- Robe, in Ethiopia
- Western Sahara

== Former apostolic prefectures ==
(very incomplete)

Most former apostolic prefectures were promoted to apostolic vicariate or territorial prelature (under a titular bishop) or (mostly later) to a diocese or even an archdiocese (under a residential bishop), but some ceased to exist (at least under their name or extent) being suppressed or sometimes dismembered.

=== Europe ===
- Iceland (promoted Diocese of Reykjavík)
- Rhodes and adjacent islands (insular Greece)
- Apostolic Prefecture of Scotland (UK)
- Luxembourg (promoted Apostolic Vicariate, now Archdiocese )

==== Germany ====
- Lausitz (Lusatia)
- Schleswig-Holstein

=== Asia ===
==== China ====
- Apostolic Prefecture of Yachow
- Yiduxian 益都縣 / Iduhsien

==== Indian subcontinent ====
- French Colonies in India (then French India)
- Jubbulpore
- Madura (Diocese of Tiruchirapalli)

==== Malay Archipelago ====
- Bangka and Biliton (now Diocese of Pangkal-Pinang)
- Batavia (now Roman Catholic Archdiocese of Jakarta)
- Brunei (now Apostolic Vicariate of Brunei)
- Labuan e Borneo, then Northern Borneo {Borneo Settentrionale} (now Archdiocese of Kota Kinabalu)
- Sarawak (now Archdiocese of Kuching)
- Kalinga and Apayao (now Apostolic Vicariate of Tabuk)
- Mindoro (now Diocese of Calapan)
- Ifugao and Mountain Province (now Apostolic Vicariate of Bontoc-Lagawe)
- Palawan (now Apostolic Vicariate of Puerto Princesa)
- Sulu (now Apostolic Vicariate of Jolo)

=== Americas ===
==== North and Central America ====
- Îles de la Terre Ferme (now Fort-de-France–Saint-Pierre)
- United States

==== South America ====
- Alto Solimões (promoted diocese)
- Apostolic Prefecture of Araucanía
- Tefé (now Territorial Prelature)
- Tumaco

=== Oceania ===
- German Solomon Islands
- Northern Solomon Islands
- South Seas Islands

=== Africa and Indian Ocean ===
==== North Africa ====
- Bahr el-Ghazal - part of the Diocese of Wau
- Delta of the Nile (Egypt)
- Equatorial Nile
- Sahara and Sudan

==== Horn of Africa ====
- Eritrea

==== Indian Ocean islands ====
- Islands of the Indian Ocean, then Bourbon (now Diocese of Saint-Denis de La Réunion)

==== West Africa ====
- Bobo-Dioulasso (promoted Archdiocese, in Burkina Faso)
- Katanga (then Belgian Congo)
- Apostolic Prefecture of Kayes (now Diocese in Mali)
- Mupoi (Diocese of Tombura-Yambio)
- N’Zérékoré
- Oubangui Chari (French colonial name of Central African Republic; now Metropolitan of Bangui)

== See also ==
- List of Catholic dioceses (alphabetical)
- List of Catholic dioceses (structured view)
- List of Roman Catholic archdioceses
- List of Catholic military ordinariates/(arch)dioceses
- List of Catholic apostolic administrations (permanent or ad hoc)
- List of Catholic apostolic vicariates
- List of Eastern Catholic exarchates
- List of Catholic territorial prelatures
- List of Catholic missions sui juris

== Sources and external links ==
- GCatholic.org - List of Current Apostolic Prefectures; and many other pages
