= Apostolic Vicariate of Northern Solomon Islands =

The Apostolic Vicariate of Northern Solomon Islands was an exempt Roman Catholic Apostolic vicariate (missionary jurisdiction akin to a diocese) in the Northern Solomon Islands (in Oceania).

== History ==
On 23 May 1898, it was established as Apostolic Prefecture of German Solomon Islands on territory split from the Apostolic Vicariate of New Pomerania which was entrusted to the Missionaries of the Sacred Heart of Issoudun. On 21 January 1904, it was renamed as Apostolic Prefecture of Northern Solomon Islands.

On 31 May 1930, it was Promoted as Apostolic Vicariate of Northern Solomon Islands, with titular bishops as ordinaries. On 11 June 1959, it lost territory to establish the Apostolic Vicariate of Western Solomon Islands. On 15 November 1966, it was promoted Roman Catholic Diocese of Bougainville and made suffragan of the Metropolitan Roman Catholic Archdiocese of Rabaul.

== Missionary Ordinaries ==
all in cumbents were members of the missionary congregation of Marists (S.M.)

Prefect Apostolic of German Solomon Islands

- Friar Eugen Englert, S.M. (1899 – 1904)

Prefects Apostolic of Northern Solomon Islands

- Friar Joseph Forestier, S.M. (1904 – 1918)
- Friar Maurice Boch, S.M. (1920 – 1929)

Vicars Apostolic of Northern Solomon Islands

- Thomas James Wade, S.M. (1930.07.03 – 1960), Titular Bishop of Barbalissus
- Leo Lemay, S.M. (1960.06.14 – 1966.11.15), titular Bishop of Agbia, who went on as first bishop of Bougainville (1966.11.15 – 1974.07.01)

== See also ==
- Catholic Church in Oceania
