= Gregory Singkai =

Roman-catholic bishop

- Bishop of Bougainville
- Church: Catholic Church
- Diocese: Diocese of Bougainville
- In office: 1 July 1974 – 12 September 1996
- Predecessor: Leo Lemay
- Successor: Henk Kronenberg

Orders
- Ordination: 17 December 1966
- Consecration: 24 November 1974 by Leo Lemay

Personal details
- Born: 1935 Koromira (in present-day Arawa Rural LLG), Mandatory Territory of New Guinea, Dominion of Australia, British Empire
- Died: 12 September 1996 (aged 60–61)

Gregory Singkai (1935 in Koromira – 12 September 1996) was a Papua New Guinean clergyman and bishop for the Roman Catholic Diocese of Bougainville. He became ordained in 1966. He was appointed bishop in 1974. He died on 12 September 1996.
