= Apostolic Prefecture of the Delta of the Nile =

Former Latin Catholic jurisdiction in Egypt

The Apostolic Prefecture (or Prefecture Apostolic) of the Delta of the Nile (Latin: Praefectura Apostolica Deltae Nili) was a Latin Church missionary jurisdiction of the Catholic Church, situated in the north of khedival Egypt, comprising four of the six provinces forming Lower Egypt: Gharbieh, Charkieb, Menufieh and Kalyiubieh.

== History ==
Prior to the establishment of the apostolic prefecture, the four provinces contained 1000 Catholics belonging to different Catholic particular churches and liturgical rites. The prefecture was erected by Propaganda Fide on 17 March 1887. In 1888, Augustin Duret, of the Lyons Society for African Missions, was appointed first Apostolic prefect and the prefecture confided to the care of this society.

It had at first only two missionary posts, one at Tantah and the other at Zagazig, but a new post was founded at Zifteh in 1887 and another at Mahalla-el-Kebir in 1891. About this time the Egyptian capital Cairo, which had already outgrown its former limits, developed considerably on the north, and populous quarters grew up within the Prefecture of the Delta. For the convenience of resident Catholics, a Latin Church parish was formed in the Choubra quarter in 1894 and given to the Fathers of the Society for African Missions; in 1896 another Latin parish under the same direction was established at Zeitoun for the outlying districts of Koubbeh, Zeitoun and Matarieh.

== Statistics ==
The official census of 1897 gave for the four provinces of the Delta a total population of 3,282,457; 73,365 being schismatics of different rites, 3091 Catholics of various rites and 241 Protestants. These figures do not distinguish the population of the quarters or outskirts from that of Cairo; on the basis of other returns, the total population of the prefecture may be estimated at about 3,500,000; 100,000 of this number being non-Catholics and 15,000 Catholics of various churches; over 5000, perhaps, belonging to the Latin Church.

The clergy and religious comprised: Priests of the African Missions, 49; Jesuits, 47; Brothers of the Christian Schools, 17; Petits Fréres de Marie, 8; Sisters of Notre-Dame des Apôtres, 92; Sisters of the Good Shepherd of Angers, 77; Ladies of the Sacred Heart, 34; Religious of Marie Réparatrice, 14; Filles de la Charité, 14; Filles de Notre-Dame des Douleurs, 9; Pieuses Mères de la Nigritie, 16.

There were 4 Latin parishes: at Choubra (Cairo quarter), Zeïtoun (suburb of Cairo), Tantah and Zagazig; 2 succursal parishes (mission churches): at Mahalla-el-Kebir and Zifteh.

The Catholic Educational Institutions were:

- 1 Jesuit college with 450 pupils
- 3 schools conducted by the Priests of the African Missions:
  - Tantah (231)
  - Zeïtoun (75)
  - Zifteh (50)
- 2 Christian Brothers' schools
  - Choubra (250)
  - Zagazig (50)
- 6 institutions of the Sisters of Notre-Dame des Apôtres:
  - Tantah (249)
  - Zagazig (150)
  - Zeïtoun (110)
  - Zifteh (100)
  - Mahalla (80)
  - Matarieh (38)
- 1 boarding-school conducted by the Ladies of the Sacred Heart (60)
- 1 institution of the Sisters of the Good Shepherd of Angers (220)

making a total of 2113 pupils.

The Catholic Charitable Institutions were: 3 hospitals: 1 conducted by the Filles de la Charité, and 2 by the Pieuses Mères de la Nigritie (150 to 200 sick); 2 orphanages: 1 for boys, conducted by the Filles de la Charité (60 orphans), and 1 for girls by the Sisters of the Good Shepherd of Angers (78 orphans); 5 dispensaries in charge of the Sisters of Notre-Dame des Apôtres, where several hundreds of sick daily receive gratuitous treatment; I home for the aged conducted by the Filles de Notre-Dame des Douleurs where from 50 to 60 inmates, both men and women, are cared for gratuitously; 1 house of refuge in charge of the Sisters of the Good Shepherd of Angers.

The Prefecture of the Delta owed its development chiefly to the prodigious growth of the city of Cairo which, in extending its limits, had to stretch out upon prefectorial territory. Here, as in all cosmopolitan and growing centres, the missionaries found their chief obstacle in religious indifference.

== See also ==
- Roman Catholicism in Egypt
