= Diocese of Kimbe =

Latin Catholic diocese in Papua New Guinea

Coordinates: 5.5602°S 150.1546°E

Diocese of Kimbe Dioecesis Kimbensis
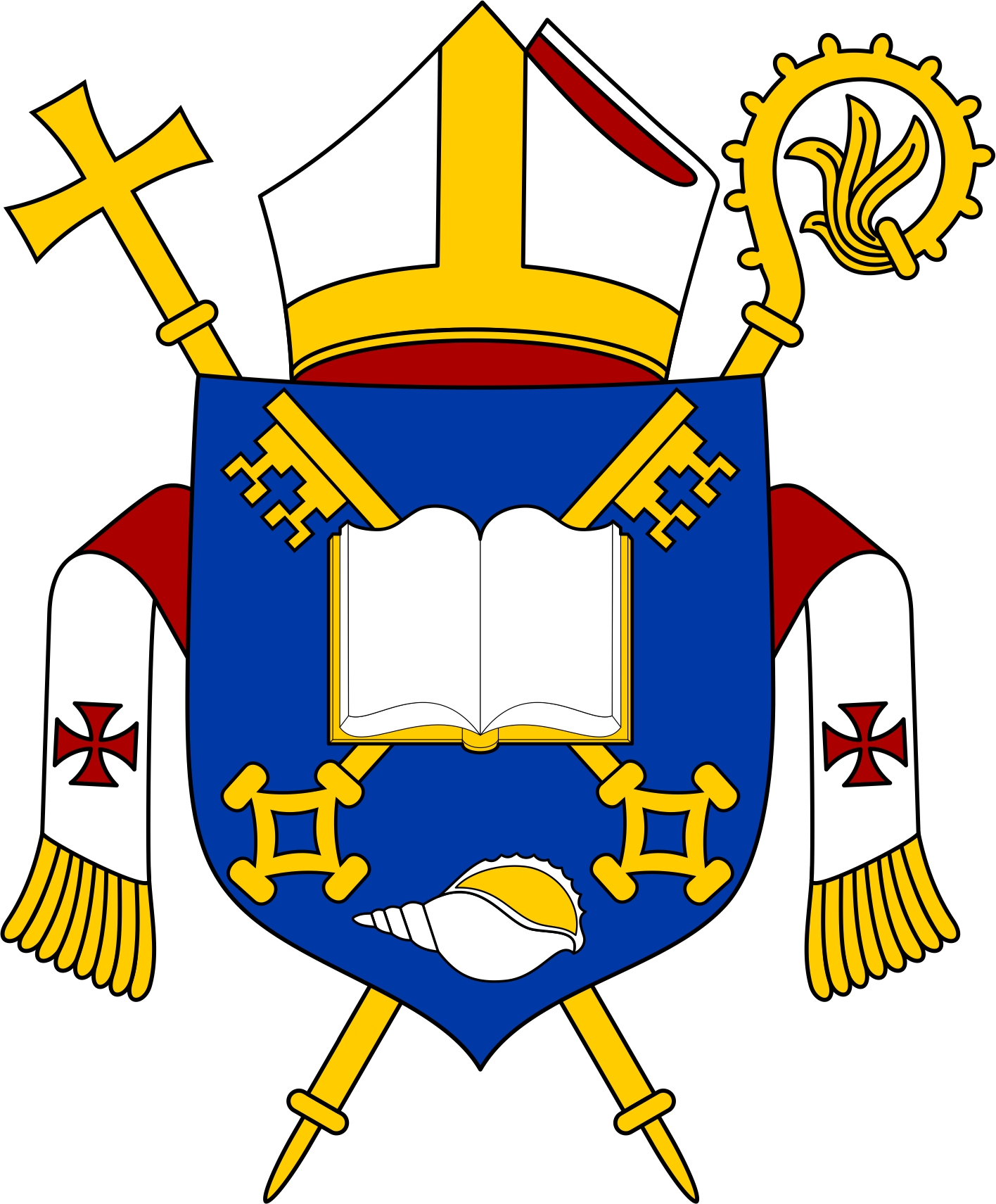
- Coat of arms

Location
- Country: Papua New Guinea
- Metropolitan: Archdiocese of Rabaul
- Headquarters: Kimbe, West New Britain Province, Papua New Guinea

Statistics
- Area: 25,300 km^{2} (9,800 sq mi)
- Population: Total; Catholics: (as of 2023); 361,000; 289,000 (80.1%)
- Parishes: 19

Information
- Denomination: Catholic Church
- Sui iuris church: Latin Church
- Rite: Roman Rite
- Established: 4 July 2003; 23 years ago
- Secular priests: 46 (39 Diocesan, 7 Religious Orders)

Current leadership
- Pope: Leo XIV
- Bishop: John Bosco Auram
- Metropolitan Archbishop: Rochus Tatamai, M.S.C.

The Diocese of Kimbe is a Latin Catholic suffragan diocese of the Archdiocese of Rabaul. It was erected in 2003.

== Bishops ==
(All Roman Rite)

- Alphonse Liguori Chaupa (4 July 2003 – 19 January 2008), resigned
- William Fey, OFMCap (8 June 2010 – 18 October 2019), retired
- John Bosco Auram (18 October 2019 – Present)

== External links and references ==
- "Diocese of Kimbe". Catholic-Hierarchy.
- papal bull - papal bull of 12 June 2003 establishing the diocese of Kimbe, accessed from vatican.va (bull published in the Acta Apostolicae Sedis vol. 95 (2003), no. 12, pp. 803-804)
