= Russell McVinney =

American prelate

His Excellency, The Most Reverend Russell Joseph McVinney
- Bishop of Providence
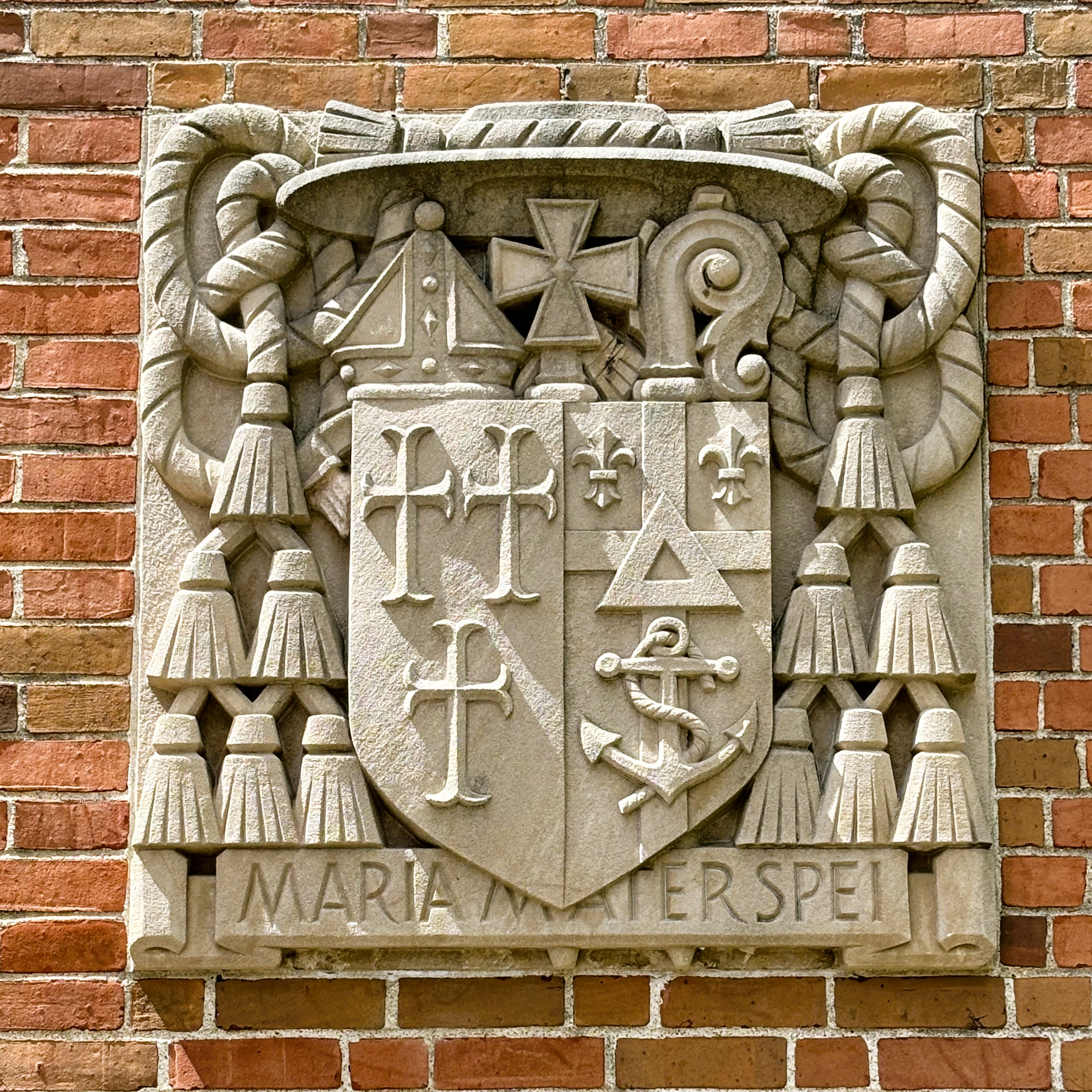
- Bishop McVinney's coat of arms on the Diocesan Chancery in Providence
- See: Diocese of Providence
- Installed: July 14, 1948
- Term ended: August 10, 1971
- Predecessor: Francis Patrick Keough
- Successor: Louis Edward Gelineau

Orders
- Ordination: July 18, 1924 by John Gregory Murray
- Consecration: July 14, 1948 by Amleto Giovanni Cicognani

Personal details
- Born: November 25, 1898 Warren, Rhode Island, US
- Died: August 10, 1971 (aged 72) Watch Hill, Rhode Island, US
- Denomination: Roman Catholic Church
- Education: St. Charles College; Grand Seminary of Montreal; St. Bernard's Seminary; American College at Louvain
- Motto: Maria mater spei (Mary mother of hope)

Styles of Russell Joseph McVinney
- Reference style: His Excellency; The Most Reverend
- Spoken style: Your Excellency
- Religious style: Bishop

Russell Joseph McVinney (November 25, 1898—August 10, 1971) was an American prelate of the Roman Catholic Church. He served as bishop of the Diocese of Providence in Rhode Island from 1948 until his death in 1971.

== Biography ==
=== Early life ===
Russell McVinney was born on November 25, 1898 in Warren, Rhode Island, to Thomas and Catherine (née Blessington) McVinney. He was baptized at St. Mary's of the Bay Church in Warren the following month. Shortly after his birth, McVinney and his family moved to the Mount Pleasant neighborhood of Providence. Since there was no parochial school at Blessed Sacrament Parish, he attended Academy Avenue Grade School, the local public school. He also attended Father Simmons' School of Religion, the religious education program at Blessed Sacrament.

In 1912, McVinney enrolled at La Salle Academy in Providence, graduating in 1916. He then attended St. Charles College in Catonsville, Maryland, from 1916 to 1918, and continued his studies at the Grand Seminary of Montreal in Montreal, Quebec, in 1918. In 1920, McVinney entered St. Bernard's Seminary in Rochester, New York, staying there for one year. He completed his studies at the American College of the Immaculate Conception in Leuven, Belgium.

=== Priesthood ===
McVinney was ordained to the priesthood for the Diocese of Providence at the American College on July 13, 1924 by Archbishop John Gregory Murray. Following his return to Rhode Island, he briefly served on a temporary assignment at the Cathedral of SS. Peter and Paul in Providence before becoming a curate at St. Patrick's Parish in Harrisville, Rhode Island. From 1929 to 1936, he served as a curate at St. Edward's Parish and a teacher at St. Raphael Academy, both in Pawtucket, Rhode Island. In 1935, McVinney studied journalism for a year at the University of Notre Dame in South Bend, Indiana.

From 1936 to 1941, McVinney served as associate editor of the Providence Visitor and did pastoral work at the Cathedral of SS. Peter and Paul. He directed the diocesan pilgrimage to the Eucharistic Congress at New Orleans, Louisiana, in 1938. He served as the first rector of the newly opened Our Lady of Providence Seminary in Warwick, Rhode Island from 1941 to 1948. During his tenure as rector, he also served as pro-synodal examiner and secretary of the body of examiners of junior clergy (1943–1948).

=== Bishop of Providence ===
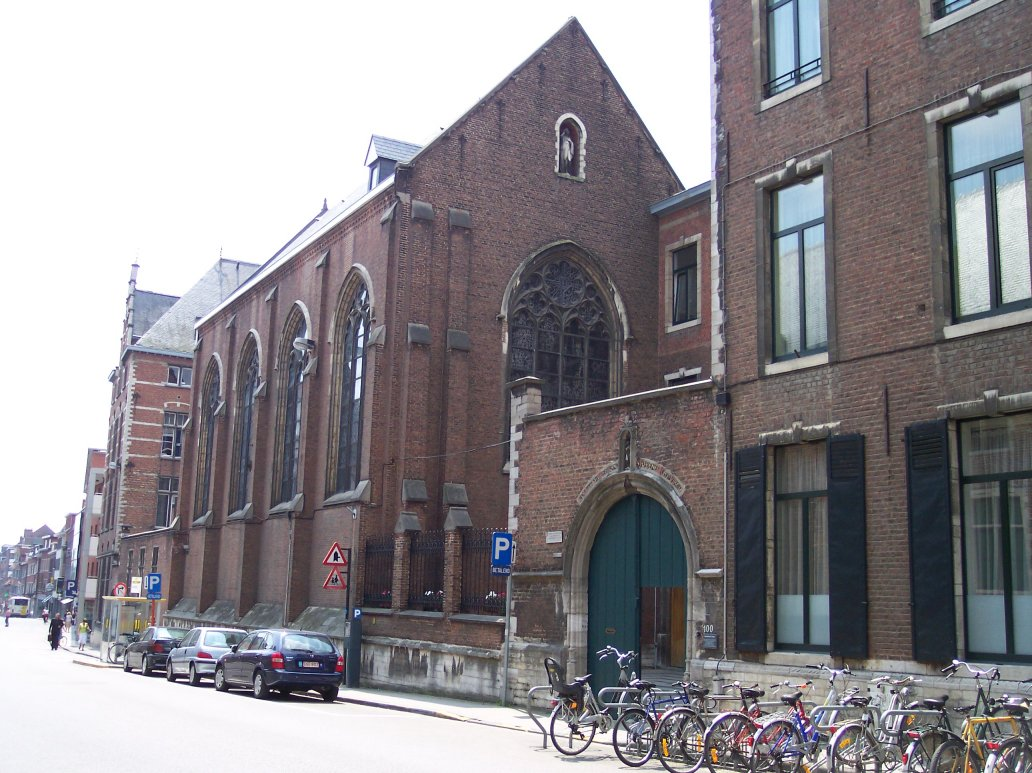
Former American College of the Immaculate Conception, Leuven, Belgium (2011)

On May 29, 1948, McVinney was appointed the fifth bishop of Providence by Pope Pius XII. He received his episcopal consecration at the Cathedral of Saints Peter and Paul in Providence on July 14, 1948, from Archbishop Amleto Giovanni Cicognani, with Bishops Henry O'Brien and James Connolly serving as co-consecrators. He was the first native of Rhode Island to serve as bishop of Providence. During his 23-year tenure in Providence, McVinney established 28 new parishes, mostly in rapidly growing suburban and rural areas of the diocese. He also established 40 new Catholic schools and oversaw the expansion of many existing schools.

The start of World War II in 1939 had forced the closure of the American College in Belgium. After the end of the war, the American bishops began to talk of reestablishing the seminary. McVinney became one of its strongest advocates. When the bishops voted in 1951 to reestablish the college, they named McVinney as chair of its new board of bishops. He then appointed Reverend Thomas Maloney, a priest from Providence, to serve as its new rector.

McVinney convoked the fourth diocesan synod in 1952. In 1954, he opened Our Lady of Fatima Hospital for the chronically ill in North Providence, Rhode Island.He founded the Sisters of Our Lady of Providence in 1955. In 1957, to accommodate the increasing number of seminarians at Our Lady of Providence Seminary, he oversaw the construction of a complex of new buildings for the seminary.

In 1957, McVinney traveled to Leuven to celebrate the American College centennial. As a result of the 1950s vocations boom in the United States, over 100 seminarians were enrolled at the college. During the celebrations, McVinney received an honorary doctorate from the Catholic University of Louvain. In 1959, he inaugurated the Brothers of Our Lady of Providence.

Between 1962 and 1965, McVinney attended all four sessions of the Second Vatican Council in Rome. He created a diocesan Liturgical Commission in 1964 and one of the first diocesan Ecumenical Commissions in the United States in 1965. He also established the Catholic Inner City Apostolate in 1966 and the diocesan Human Relations Commission in 1967.

=== Death ===
Russell McVinney died in Watch Hill, Rhode Island, on August 10, 1971, at age 72. The American College of the Immaculate Conception closed permanently in 2011 due to a massive drop in enrollment and the difficulty of finding faculty.

== Views ==
=== Communion by hand ===
McVinney opposed the priest giving the communion to a recipient by hand instead of mouth. He believed the practice violated the dignity of both the communicant and the consecrated host. When the proposal arose before the National Conference of Catholic Bishops in 1970, he termed it a "dangerous procedure leading to a precipitous decline" and an invitation to "weirdos."

=== Divorce ===
McVinney took a strict interpretation of canon law regarding divorce. In 1952, he established a set rules regarding divorce, separation and annulment for his diocese.

- Catholic lawyers must receive permission from the bishop before representing plaintiffs in separation, divorce or annulment cases involving a Catholic marriage, "under pain of mortal sin".
- Catholics must not attend marriages involving a Catholic before a non-Catholic clergyman or a justice of the peace, nor should they attend the wedding party or give a wedding gift to the couple.
- Catholics who are themselves invalidly married may not act as witnesses, ushers, or bridesmaids at Catholic weddings.
- Catholics are forbidden to act as witnesses, ushers or bridesmaids at non-Catholic weddings.

=== Film ===
In 1957, McVinney exhorted Catholics to follow the Legion of Decency's condemnation of the 1956 film Baby Doll due to its sexual themes, even in its censored version.

=== Morality ===
In 1952, at the Manhattan College commencement ceremony in New York City, McVinney condemned so-called contemporary morality. He claimed that it attempted to "ride on the coattails of democracy," and was encouraging obedience to an "objective" ethical standard.

=== Politics ===
During the 1970 U.S. Senate election, McVinney chastised Reverend John McLaughlin, a Jesuit priest, for not getting his permission to run for the United States Senate in Rhode Island. McVinney claimed that McLaughlin's candidacy "has caused a great deal of confusion and misunderstanding in this state." McLaughlin responded that he did not need McVinney's permission, and that the bishop was influenced by his lifelong friendship with McLaughlin's opponent, Senator John O. Pastore."

== See also ==
Catholic Church titles
Preceded by Francis Patrick Keough	Bishop of Providence; 1948–1971	Succeeded by Louis Edward Gelineau
