= Thomas Francis Maloney =

Thomas Francis Maloney (April 17, 1903 – September 10, 1962) was a Roman Catholic priest and subsequently bishop who served as the sixth rector of the American College of the Immaculate Conception in Louvain, Belgium, and later as an auxiliary bishop of the diocese of Providence.

== Early years and education ==
Maloney was born on 17 April 1903 in Providence, Rhode Island. As a seminarian for the diocese of Providence, he studied at the American College of the Immaculate Conception in Louvain, completing his studies in Louvain in 1930 and being ordained a priest the same year.

== Rector of the American College ==
Maloney's alma mater, the American College at Louvain, was shuttered in 1939 because of the imminent Second World War. It remained closed through the years of the war, and it was only in 1949 that the possibility of reopening the college began to be discussed again by the American bishops.

Maloney's bishop, Most Reverend Russell McVinney of the diocese of Providence, was keen to reopen the college. When McVinney became chair of the American College's new board of bishops in 1951, he appointed Maloney as the new rector. Maloney, as the first American to serve as rector of the college, faced the difficult challenge of rebuilding a seminary that had been dormant for more than a decade. The Naamsestraat property of the college was returned officially to the American bishops by the university in 1952, with the blessing of the university's rector, Honoré van Waeyenbergh. Maloney arrived again in Louvain in spring of 1952, and made way for the arrival of the first 54 seminarians that autumn.

Maloney strove to connect his students with the traditions of the college, again celebrating patronal feasts, singing the college's characteristic hymn O Sodales on feast days, and placing a portrait of the fourth rector of the college, Jules de Becker, in the dining room. Those first years were challenging ones for the students, due to physical deprivations, but the newly republished American College Bulletin nevertheless speaks to the spirit of fraternity that existed in the college in those years.

In 1955, Maloney began renovations of the American College building, leading up the centennial celebrations of the College in 1957. By 1957, the college had been significantly renovated, and the number of seminarians had risen to over one hundred as a result of the 1950s vocations boom in the United States. Maloney and van Waeyenbergh welcomed Maloney's ordinary, Bishop Russell McVinney; and Bishop Fulton J. Sheen to the college for the celebration, both of whom received honorary doctorates from the university. Maloney remained as rector of the American College for three more years thereafter, caring for the thriving institution that he had rebuilt.

== Auxiliary Bishop of Providence ==
On 2 January 1960, Maloney was appointed the auxiliary bishop of Providence by Pope John XXIII.

As a result, he left his position as rector of the American College, and was consecrated as titular bishop of Andropolis on the 11 May 1960.

He died in 1962 at the age of 59, only two years after his consecration as bishop.

== See also ==
Academic offices
Preceded by Pierre de Strycker	American College Rector; 1952–1960	Succeeded by Paul Riedl
Catholic Church titles
Preceded by –	Auxiliary Bishop of Providence; 1960–1962	Succeeded by –
