= Apostolic Prefecture of Schleswig-Holstein =

Former Latin Catholic jurisdiction in Germany

The Apostolic Prefecture of Schleswig-Holstein was a short-lived Latin Church pre-diocesan prefecture of the Catholic Church in northern Germany's Schleswig-Holstein region which existed from 1868 to 1930.

== History ==
- The territory of the former Diocese of Schleswig, which had to be suppressed in 1624 (like many sees in the Baltic region, due to the Lutheran Reformation), was restored on 29 July 1868 as Apostolic Prefecture of Schleswig-Holstein / Sleswigis Holsatiæ (Latin), split off again from the 'generic' Apostolic Vicariate of Northern Germany, which had tended to north German Catholics under Protestant rule during the long interval.
- On 13 August 1930 it was suppressed, its territory being merged in the restored German Roman Catholic Diocese of Osnabruck, whose Bishops has effectively already invariably held it in personal union (as well as the remainder of the Apostolic Vicariate) anyhow.

== Ordinaries ==
(all Germans, none resident in the jurisdiction)

Apostolic Prefects of Schleswig-Holstein

- Heinrich Hubertus Aloysius Voß (30 August 1899 – died 3 March 1914), while Bishop of Osnabrück (Germany) (12 April 1899 – 3 March 1914) and Pro-Apostolic Vicar of North German Missions (Germany) (30 August 1899 – 3 March 1914)
  - Apostolic Administrator Hermann Wilhelm Berning (15 September 1914 – 22 November 1921) see below
- Hermann Wilhelm Berning (22 November 1921 – 13 August 1930), while Bishop of Osnabrück (Germany) (14 July 1914 – 23 November 1955) and first Pro-Vicar Apostolic of North German Missions (Germany) (15 September 1914 – 22 November 1921) then Vicar Apostolic of North German Missions (Germany) (22 November 1921 – 13 August 1930), both as above; later emeritus as Archbishop ad personam (1950 – died 23 November 1955).

== See also ==
- List of Catholic dioceses in Germany
- List of Catholic dioceses in Denmark
