= Leo Lemay (bishop) =

American Catholic prelate (1909–1983)

Leo Lemay S.M.
- Bishop of Bougainville
- Church: Catholic Church
- Diocese: Diocese of Bougainville
- In office: June 14, 1960 – July 1, 1974
- Predecessor: Thomas James Wade
- Successor: Gregory Singkai
- Previous post: Titular Bishop of Agbia (1960-1966)

Orders
- Ordination: April 15, 1933 by Francesco Marchetti Selvaggiani
- Consecration: September 21, 1960 by Maximilian von Fürstenberg

Personal details
- Born: September 23, 1909 Lawrence, Massachusetts, United States
- Died: September 9, 1983 (aged 73)

Leo Lemay (September 23, 1909 – September 9, 1983) was a Roman Catholic bishop.

Born in Lawrence, Massachusetts, United States, Lemay was ordained for the Society of Mary on August 15, 1933. On June 14, 1960, Lemay was appointed vicar apostolic of the Vicariate Apostolic of Northern Solomon Islands, Papua New Guinea, and titular bishop of Agbia. He was ordained bishop on September 21, 1960. On November 15, 1966, Lemay was appointed first bishop of the Roman Catholic Diocese of Bougainville. On July 1, 1974, Lemay resigned.
