= O sodales =

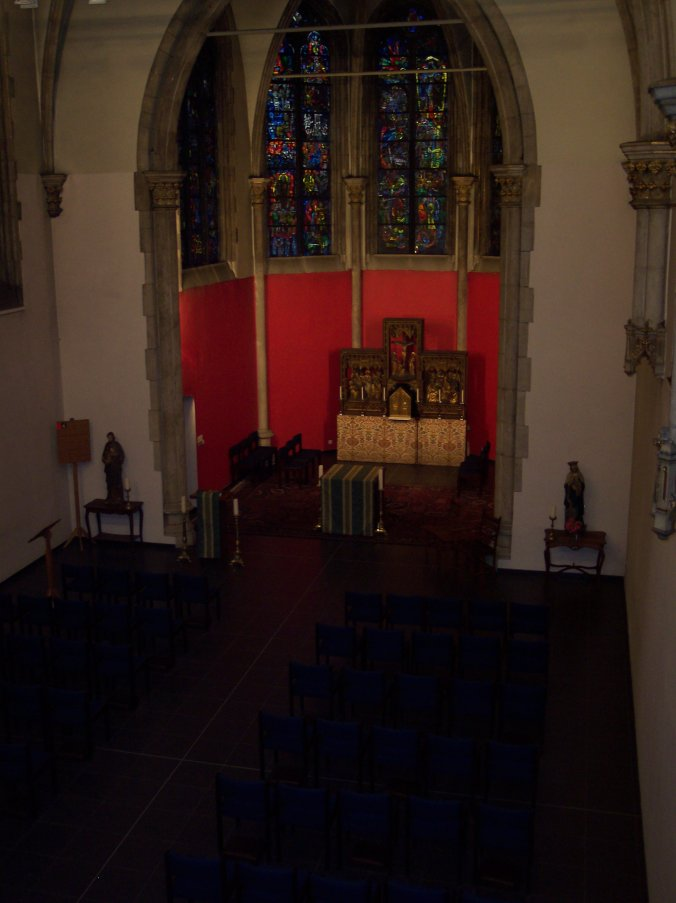
The Immaculate Conception Chapel of the American College, in which O sodales has been sung countless times. The neogothic chapel dates from 1891, nearly 30 years after the composition of hymn.

O sodales is a Roman Catholic hymn to the Blessed Virgin Mary. It is also the signature song of the American College of the Immaculate Conception, the American seminary located in Leuven, Belgium, which has maintained the hymn over the past century and a half.

== Origins ==
The tune of the hymn is reputed to have been composed by seminarians fleeing before the armies of Napoleon in the early 19th century.

The Latin text of the hymn as it has been passed down over the years was composed by one of the earliest seminarians of the college, Gustave Limpens, in 1862. It reflects the fraternity felt at the college at the time, as well as the seminarian's missionary zeal to go to North America. The song composed by Limpens was passed down over the years at the American College, until it gradually became accepted as its signature hymn. The college closed because of the Second World War, but was reopened in 1952 by its sixth rector, Thomas Francis Maloney, who reintroduced the hymn to the college, where it has been sung regularly ever since.

== Contemporary usage ==
The hymn remains well known among the college's students and alumni today. It is regularly sung at special events at the American College during the academic year, especially at the opening banquet in the autumn, the college's patronal feast of the Immaculate Conception on December 8, and the closing banquet in June. At the closing banquet, it is the tradition of the college that, during the singing of O Sodales, the graduating students stand on chairs facing west toward North America.

== Lyrics ==
	Latin lyrics	English Translation
Refrain	O sodales geminemus voce plena saepius in hac die peramoena vivat Virgo virginum.	O companions, let us more frequently join together with full voice on this very pleasant day singing: May the Virgin of Virgins live forever!
Verse 1	Ad Mariam matrem piam hæc domus eloquia virgam Jesse spem opresæ mentis et refugium.	This company expresses praise to Mary, our loving Mother, flower of Jesse, hope and recourse for burdened hearts.
Verse 2	Pius nonus hanc conceptus dixit sine macula gentes cunctæ sic laudatum salutarunt plausibus.	Pope Pius the Ninth declared her conception without stain and so all peoples have greeted this declaration with applause.
Verse 3	O quam fulget et quam pulchra stans ad thronum Filii! O quam potens quam benigne voces nostras excipit.	O how resplendent and how beautiful she stands at the throne of her Son! O how powerfully and how graciously she accepts our requests.
Verse 4	Audi Mater preces nostras; robus adde cordibus, ad certandas Dei pugnas velis nos instruere.	Dear Mother, attend to our prayers; give strength to our hearts, teach us to fight the battles of God with your might.
Verse 5	Sub vexillo Tui Nati ad bellandum gredimus da nos gressus Crucifixi prædicantes insequi.	We have advanced in combat under the banner of your Son, show us the way to follow the preachers of the Crucified One.
Verse 6	Per te fontem sacra verba descendans in labia ut amantis cordis flammam excitare valeant.	From your lips as from a fountain the holy words descend so that they may enkindle a flame of love in our hearts.
Verse 7	Fac nos omnes lætabundos te Patrona, strenue exsilire prædicatum fidem in America.	With you as our Patron, make us all full of joy to steadfastly proclaim the faith in America.
Final Refrain	O Sodales supplicemus Matrem semper virginem ut illæsos nos conducat omnes in Americam!	O Companions, let us beseech our Ever-virgin Mother to bring together all of us unharmed into America!
