= Thomas James Wade =

Thomas James Wade SM
- Vicar Apostolic of Northern Solomon Islands
- Church: Catholic Church
- See: Apostolic Vicariate of Northern Solomon Islands
- In office: July 3, 1930 – June 14, 1960
- Predecessor: Maurice Boch
- Successor: Leo Lemay
- Previous post: Titular Bishop of Barbalissus (1930-1969)

Orders
- Ordination: June 15, 1922 by Thomas Joseph Shahan
- Consecration: October 26, 1930 by Bartolomeo Cattaneo

Personal details
- Born: August 4, 1893 Providence, Rhode Island, United States
- Died: June 11, 1969 (aged 75) Daly City, California, United States

Thomas James Wade (August 4, 1893 – June 11, 1969) was a Roman Catholic bishop.

Born in Providence, Rhode Island, United States, Wade was ordain a priest on June 15, 1922, for the Society of Mary. On July 3, 1930, Wade was appointed bishop for the Vicariate Apostolic of Northern Solomon Islands, Papua New Guinea, and auxiliary bishop of Barbalissus. Wade was ordained bishop on October 14, 1930; he resigned on June 14, 1960.

As the first native English speaking Catholic bishop in the Pacific missions, Wade was able to secure strong support from Australia and the United States and his mission was successful despite major disruption during the Japanese occupation.
