= Francis John Doyle =

Australian Roman Catholic bishop

The Most Reverend Francis John Doyle
- Bishop of Diocese of Sideia
- Diocese: Sideia
- Installed: 15 November 1966
- Term ended: 7 March 1970
- Other posts: Prefect of Samarai (1951–1956); Titular Bishop of Onuphis (1956–1966); Vicar Apostolic of Samarai (1956–1966)

Orders
- Ordination: 30 November 1926 at St Mary's Cathedral, Sydney by Patrick Vincent Dwyer
- Consecration: 25 February 1957 at Our Lady of the Sacred Heart Church, Randwick by Romolo Carboni

Personal details
- Born: Francis John Doyle; 6 October 1897 Noorat, Victoria, Australia
- Died: 4 November 1973 (aged 76) Boroko, National Capital District, Papua New Guinea
- Buried: Port Moresby, National Capital District, Papua New Guinea
- Denomination: Catholic Church
- Occupation: Catholic bishop

Francis John Doyle (6 October 1897 — 4 November 1973) was an Australian-born clergyman and bishop for the Roman Catholic Diocese of Alotau-Sideia.

== Early life ==
Doyle was born in Noorat on 6 October 1987, to William and Mary Doyle. He received his primary education at St Ignatius' Boys School, Richmond, run by the De La Salle Brothers. He received his secondary education at the Apostolic School, Douglas Park, a preparatory minor seminary run by the Missionaries of the Sacred Heart, to prepare young men entering the novitiate.

== Priesthood ==
On 30 November 1926, he was ordained a priest for the Missionaries of the Sacred Heart at St Mary's Cathedral, Sydney by Bishop Patrick Vincent Dwyer. He was one of eight men from the Missionaries of the Sacred Heart to be ordained to the priesthood during the ceremony.

He received his first appointment in 1927, sent to the mission on Thursday Island in Queensland. In 1930, he was sent to found the mission in Samarai, a small island off the eastern tip of Papua New Guinea. In Samarai, he faced many difficulties as a missionary, with a complete lack of funds and no suitable sea-going launch. He initially stayed in a disused butcher's shop, as no other suitable accommodation could be found. There were just 12 Catholics in the region, which led Doyle to quip he had "the smallest parish in the world".

He returned to Sydney briefly in 1931 to fundraise for the mission. He returned to Thursday Island by 1934 and served as parish priest.

He served as rector of Downlands College in Toowoomba from 1938 to 1945. During the war, the college served as a hospital and many of the students had to be sent to Dalby. In 1945, he was sent to Darwin to serve as Superior of the mission there. He returned to Sydney in 1948, where he was parish priest of Randwick.

== Episcopate ==
On 18 May 1951, Doyle was appointed the first Prefect of Samarai. On 11 November 1956, it was raised to the status of Vicariate Apostolic and he was appointed Titular Bishop of Onuphis. He was consecrated a bishop on 25 February 1957 at Our Lady of the Sacred Heart Church, Randwick by Archbishop Romolo Carboni.

He brought many priests from Downlands College to assist him in his ministry in the region. He also had several lay missionaries working in the Mission, including three of the children of Maria von Trapp, the inspiration for the 1965 film The Sound of Music.

On 15 November 1966, the Vicariate Apostolic was raised to the status of a diocese and named the Diocese of Sideia, with Doyle becoming its first bishop.

One of Doyle's proudest achievements as bishop, was the ordination of the first local priest of the Diocese: Father John Mathew Sinou MSC. With the support of Doyle, he was to study for the priesthood and was ordained by him on 7 March 1969.

== Retirement and death ==
On 7 May 1970, Doyle resigned as Bishop of Sideia due to ill-health and was appointed Titular Bishop of Árd Carna. Doyle died on 4 November 1973. He was found dead the next day, at De Boismenu College, Bomana, where he had been living since retirement. He had suffered from high blood pressure for several years.
