= St. Mary's Cathedral, Port Moresby =

Coordinates: 9°28′51″S 147°08′59″E

St. Mary's Cathedral
- St. Mary's Cathedral
- Location: Port Moresby
- Country: Papua New Guinea
- Denomination: Catholic Church
- Sui iuris church: Latin Church

Administration
- Archdiocese: Archdiocese of Port Moresby

St. Mary's Cathedral is a religious building affiliated with the Catholic Church, in the city of Port Moresby, capital of Papua New Guinea,].

The cathedral is the headquarters of the Metropolitan Archdiocese of Port Moresby (Archidioecesis Portus Moresbiensis) in the National Capital District. It was visited by John Paul II in May 1984. It is dedicated to the Blessed Virgin Mary. The exterior is decorated with light blue and a white tower stands on one side of the main entrance.

== See also ==
- Catholic Church in Papua New Guinea
- St. Mary's Cathedral (disambiguation)
- Roman Catholic Archdiocese of Port Moresby
