= Apostolic Prefecture of Robe =

Catholic missionary jurisdiction in Ethiopia

The Apostolic Prefecture of Robe is a Latin Catholic missionary pre-diocesan jurisdiction in part of Ethiopia, East Africa.

It is exempt, i.e. directly dependent on the Holy See (notably the missionary Roman Congregation for the Evangelization of Peoples), not part of any ecclesiastical province. Its cathedral episcopal see is the Cathedral of Emmanuel, in Robe (Oromia Region).

== History ==
Established 2012-02-11 on as Apostolic Prefecture of Robe on territory split off from the Apostolic Vicariate of Meki.

== Ordinaries ==
(Roman Rite, so far missionary members of a Latin congregation)

Apostolic Prefects of Robe

- Father Angelo Antolini, Capuchin Franciscans (O.F.M. Cap.) (2012-02-11 – ...)

== See also ==
- Roman Catholicism in Ethiopia

== Source and external links ==
- GCatholic
