= Bernard Unabali =

Papua New Guinean Roman Catholic bishop (1957–2019)

- Bishop of Bougainville
- Archdiocese: Bougainville

Personal details
- Born: Bernard Unabali; May 5, 1957 Bougainville, Territory of Papua and New Guinea
- Died: August 10, 2019 (aged 62) Quezon City, Philippines
- Denomination: Roman Catholic

Bernard Unabali (5 May 1957 – 10 August 2019) was a Papua New Guinean Roman Catholic bishop who served as Bishop of the Roman Catholic Diocese of Bougainville.

Unabali was born in Papua New Guinea and was ordained to the priesthood in 1985. He served as titular bishop of Cuicul and as auxiliary bishop of the Roman Catholic Diocese of Bougainville, Papua New Guinea, from 2006 to 2009. He then served as bishop of the diocese from 2009 until his death on 10 August 2019 at the St. Luke's Medical Center in Quezon City, Philippines.
