= Rochus Tatamai =

Roman Catholic bishop from Papua New Guinea

Rochus Tatamai M.S.C.
- Archbishop of Rabaul
- Church: Catholic Church
- Archdiocese: Archdiocese of Rabaul
- Appointed: 19 June 2020
- Predecessor: Francesco Panfilo
- Previous posts: Apostolic Administrator of Kavieng (2020-2023); Bishop of Kavieng (2018-2020); Bishop of Bereina (2007-2018); Titular Bishop of Accia (2005-2007); Auxiliary Bishop of Kerema (2005-2007)

Orders
- Ordination: 26 November 1989
- Consecration: 29 September 2005 by Karl Hesse

Personal details
- Born: 24 September 1962 (age 63) Raduna, Rabaul, Territory of New Guinea, Australia
- Coat of arms

Rochus Tatamai (born September 24, 1962 in Raduna, Rabaul) is a Papua New Guinean clergyman and bishop for the Roman Catholic Diocese of Bereina. He was appointed bishop in 2007. He left to assume the same position in Rabaul in 2020.

Between 2017 and 2020, Rochus Tatamai was the President of the Catholic Bishops Conference of Papua New Guinea and Solomon Islands.
