= Cape Dampier =

Coordinates: 6°1′48.72″S 151°0′30.54″E

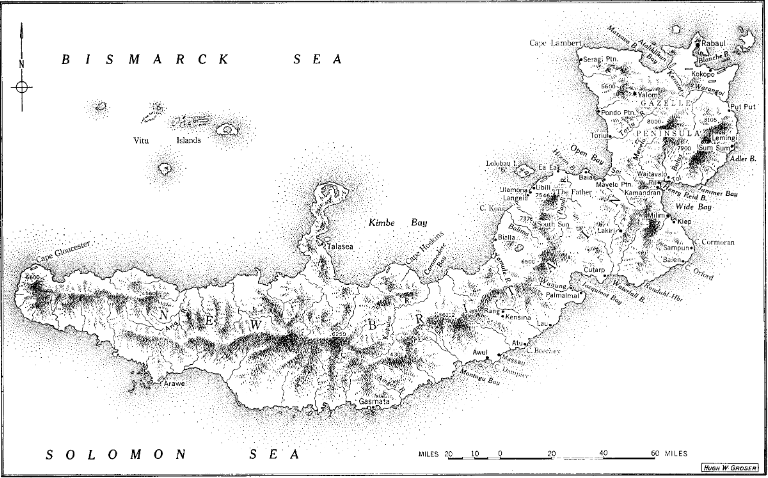
Map of New Britain

Cape Dampier is a cape on the south coast of western New Britain. It is located approximately midway between Gasmata and Jacquinot Bay. It is named for the English explorer, William Dampier.
