= Archdiocese of Rabaul =

Latin Catholic archdiocese in Papua New Guinea

Coordinates: 4.3441°S 152.2770°E

Archdiocese of Rabaul Archidioecesis Rabaulensis
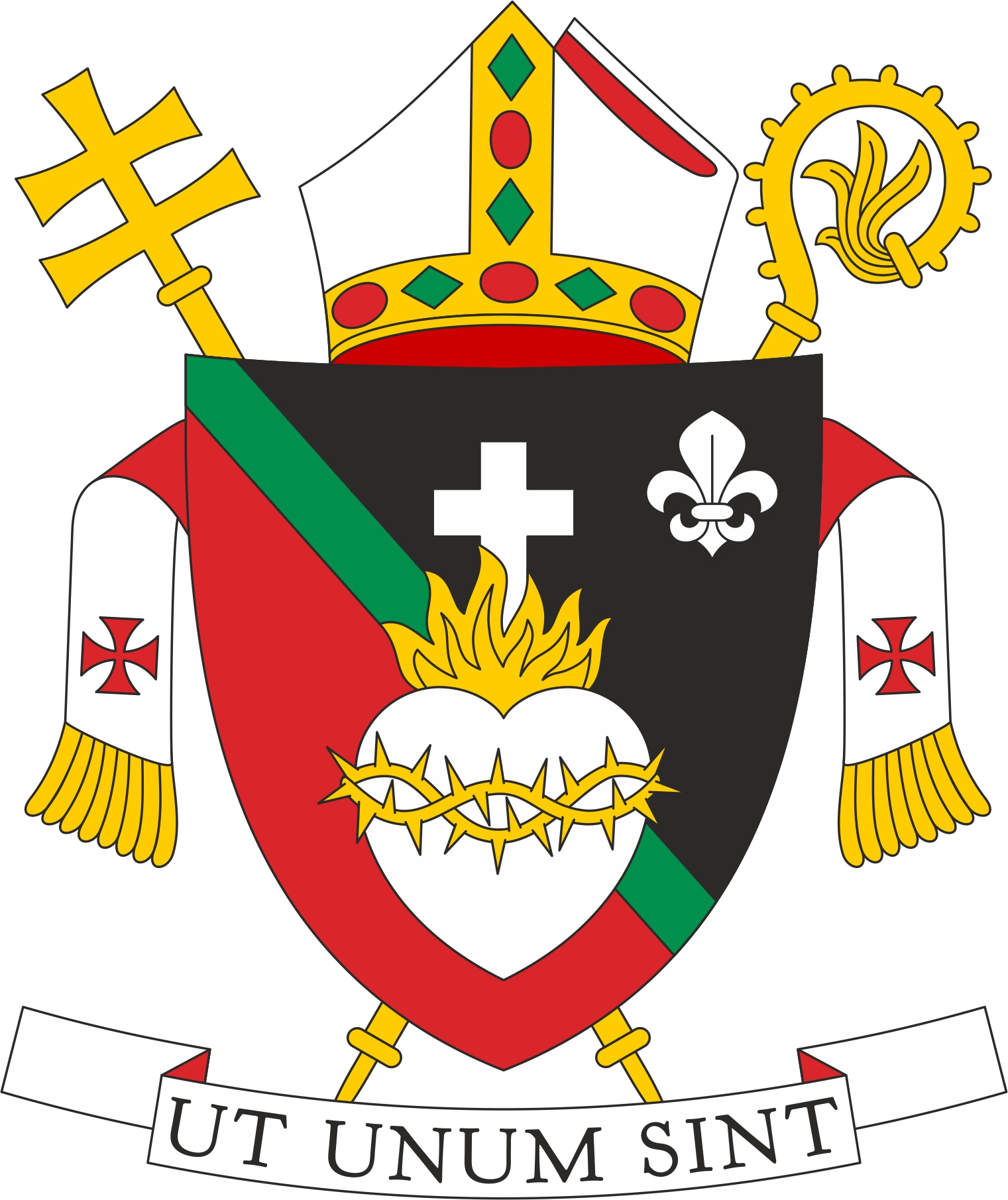
- Coat of arms

Location
- Country: Papua New Guinea
- Headquarters: Kokopo, East New Britain Province

Statistics
- Area: 19,320 km^{2} (7,460 sq mi)
- Population: Total; Catholics: (as of 2023); 413,000; 191,400 (46.3%)
- Parishes: 41

Information
- Denomination: Catholic Church
- Sui iuris church: Latin Church
- Rite: Roman Rite
- Established: 10 May 1889; 137 years ago
- Cathedral: Sacred Heart Cathedral, Vunapope
- Co-cathedral: Saint Francis Xavier Co-Cathedral, Rabaul
- Secular priests: 73
- Metropolitan Archbishop: Rochus Tatamai, M.S.C.
- Bishops emeritus: Francesco Panfilo, S.D.B.

The Archdiocese of Rabaul is a Latin Catholic metropolitan archdiocese of the Catholic Church in Papua New Guinea.

Its episcopal see is shared between Sacred Heart Cathedral in Vunapope and Saint Francis Xavier Co-Cathedral in Rabaul.

The current Archbishop of Rabaul is Rochus Josef Tatamai, M.S.C., who was appointed by Pope Francis on June 19, 2020,

== History ==
In 1844, the Apostolic Vicariate of Melanesia was established with territory split off from the Apostolic Vicariate of Western Oceania.

On 8 December 1890, a new jurisdiction was carved from this, the Apostolic Vicariate of New Pomerania.

It lost territories repeatedly :

- on 1896.02.24, to form the Apostolic Prefecture of Kaiser-Wilhelms-Land;
- on 1897.06.28, to form the Apostolic Vicariate of Gilbert Islands;
- on 1897.07.27, to form the Apostolic Prefecture of British Solomons;
- on 1898.05.23, to form the Apostolic Prefecture of German Solomon Islands (now Rabaul's suffragan Diocese of Bougainville); and
- in 1905, to form the Mission sui juris of Marshall Islands.

On 14 November 1922, it was renamed the Apostolic Vicariate of Rabaul.

On 5 July 1957, it lost territory again to establish the Apostolic Vicariate of Kavieng (now Rabaul's suffragan diocese).

On 15 November 1966, the diocese became the Metropolitan Archdiocese of Rabaul.

On 4 July 2003, it lost territory to establish another suffragan Diocese of Kimbe.

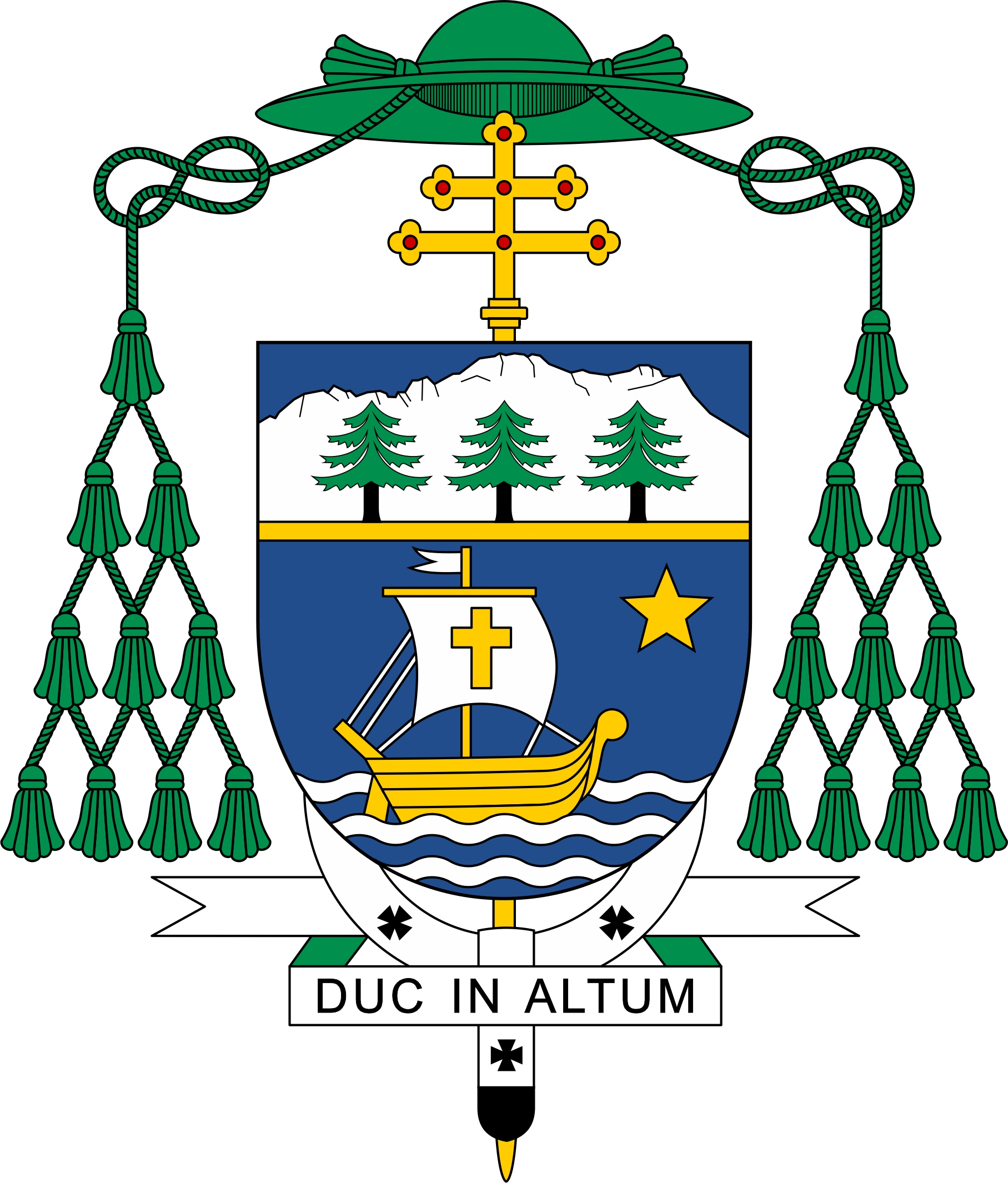
Coat of arms of Archbishop Emeritus Francesco Panfilo S.D.B.

== Province ==
Its ecclesiastical province comprises, besides the Metropolitan's Archdiocese, the following suffragan bishoprics :

- Diocese of Bougainville
- Diocese of Kavieng
- Diocese of Kimbe.

== Bishops ==
(all Roman Rite; so far missionary members of Latin congregations)

=== Ordinaries ===
Apostolic Vicars of Melanesia

- Jean Baptiste Epalle, Marists (S.M.) (1844.07.19 – death 1845.12.19)
- Jean Georges Collomb, S.M. (1846.02.19 – death 1848.07.16)
- Father Paolo Reina, Pontifical Institute for Foreign Missions M.E.M. (1852.01.11 – death 1861.03.14)
- Louis-André Navarre, Sacred Heart Missionaries (M.S.C.) (1887.05.17 – 1889.05.10), appointed Apostolic Vicar of New Guinea

Apostolic Vicars of New Britain

- Stanislas Henri Verjus, M.S.C. (1889.05.10 – 1889.12.28), appointed Coadjutor Vicar Apostolic of New Guinea (Papua New Guinea)
- Louis Couppé, M.S.C. (1889.12.28 – 1890.12.08 see below)

Apostolic Vicar of new Pomerania

- Louis Couppé, M.S.C. (see above 1890.12.08 – 1922.11.14 see below)

Apostolic Vicars of Rabaul

- Louis Couppé, M.S.C. (see below 1922.11.14 – retired 1923)
- Gerard Vesters (Gerardo Vesters), M.S.C. (1923.02.16 – resigned 1939)
- Leo Isidore Scharmach, M.S.C. (1939.06.13 – resigned 1962)
- Johannes Höhne, M.S.C. (1963.03.01 – 1966.11.15 see below)

Metropolitan Archbishops of Rabaul

- Johannes Höhne, M.S.C. (1966.11.15 – death 1978.05.27)
- Albert-Leo Bundervoet, M.S.C. (1980.03.06 – death 1989.08.16)
- Karl Hesse, M.S.C. (1990.07.07 – retired 2011.08.11)
- Francesco Panfilo, Salesians (S.D.B.) (2011.08.11 – retired 2020.06.19)
- Rochus Tatamai, M.S.C. (19 June 2020 – Present)

=== Coadjutor archbishop ===
- Francesco Panfilo, S.D.B. (2010-2011)

=== Auxiliary bishops ===
- Karl Hesse, M.S.C. (1978-1980), appointed Bishop of Kavieng (later returned here as archbishop)
- George To Bata (1978-1995)
- Patrick Taval, M.S.C. (1999-2007), appointed Coadjutor Bishop of Kerema
- Alphonse Liguori Chaupa (2000-2003), appointed Bishop of Kimbe
- John Doaninoel, S.M. (2007-2011), appointed Auxiliary Bishop of Honiara, Solomon Islands

=== Other priests of this diocese who became bishops ===
- Herman To Paivu, appointed Auxiliary Bishop of Port Moresby in 1974
- Benedict To Varpin, appointed Bishop of Bereina in 1979
- Francis Meli, appointed Bishop of Vanimo in 2018

== See also ==
- List of Catholic dioceses in Papua New Guinea & Solomon Islands

== Sources and external links ==
- GigaCatholic, with incumbent biography links
