= Francesco Panfilo =

Italian Roman Catholic bishop

The Most Reverend Francesco Panfilo D.D.
- Archbishop Emeritus of Rabaul
- Church: Roman Catholic Church
- Archdiocese: Rabaul
- See: Alotau-Sideia
- Appointed: 11 August, 2011
- Term ended: 19 June, 2020
- Predecessor: Karl Hese
- Successor: “Incumbent”
- Previous post: Bishop of Alotau–Sideia

Orders
- Ordination: 27 April 1974 by Clemente Gaddi
- Consecration: 8 September 2001 by Desmond Charles Moore

Personal details
- Born: 23 November 1942 (age 83) Vilminore di Scalve, Bergamo, Italy
- Denomination: Roman Catholic
- Motto: Duc in altum (Put out into the deep)
- Coat of arms

Ordination history
History
Priestly ordination
- Ordained by: Clemente Gaddi
Episcopal consecration
- Principal consecrator: Desmond Charles Moore
- Co-consecrators: Francis Meli; Pedro Centeno Baquero

The Most Reverend Francesco Panfilo, S.D.B. (born November 23, 1942, in Vilminore di Scalve) is an Salesian-Italian clergyman and bishop for the Roman Catholic Diocese of Alotau-Sideia in Papua New Guinea. He was appointed Bishop of Alotau-Sideia in 2001, and Coadjutor Archbishop of Rabaul in 2011. He became Archbishop of Rabaul in 2012.

He was the Rector of Don Bosco Technical College from 1977 to 1985 in the Philippines.

Between 2008 and 2011, Francesco Panfilo was the President of the Catholic Bishops Conference of Papua New Guinea and Solomon Islands.

He retired in 2020, intending to spend it in the Philippines and now commonly celebrates masses at the Minor Basilica and National Shrine of Mary, Help of Christians in Parañaque City.

Styles of Francesco Panfilo
- Reference style: The Most Reverend
- Spoken style: Your Excellency
- Religious style: Bishop
