= Karl Hesse =

German Catholic prelate (1936–2023)

- Archbishop Emeritus of Rabaul
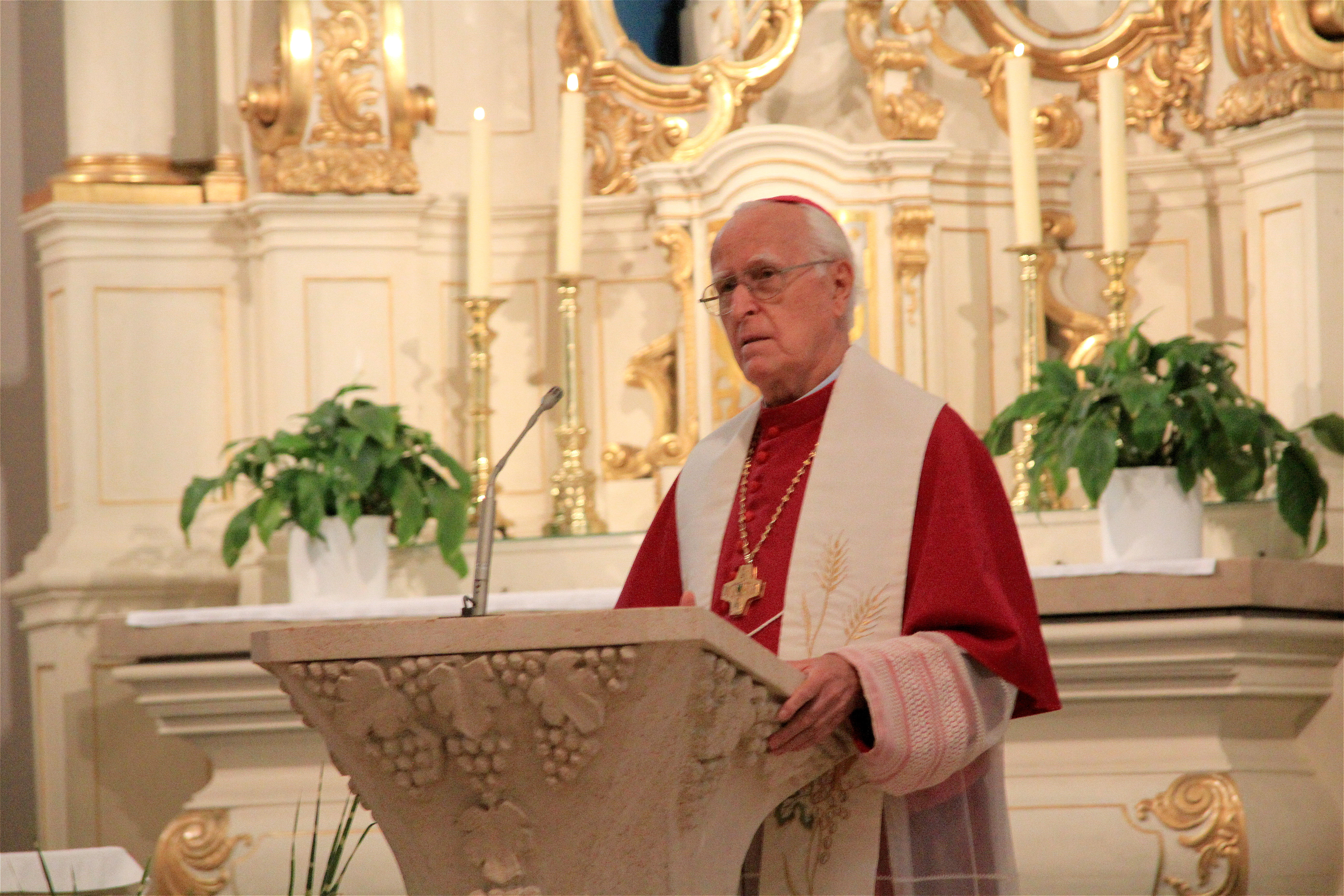
- Hesse at a service in 2012
- Archdiocese: Rabaul
- Appointed: 7 July 1990
- Installed: 16 September 1991
- Term ended: 11 August 2011
- Predecessor: Albert-Leo Bundervoet
- Successor: Francesco Panfilo
- Previous posts: Auxiliary Bishop of Rabaul and Titular Bishop of Naratcata (1978–1980); Bishop of Kavieng (1980–1990)

Orders
- Ordination: 23 May 1963
- Consecration: 15 August 1978 by Andrea Cordero Lanza di Montezemolo

Personal details
- Born: 15 August 1936 Arnsberg, Gau Westphalia-South, Germany
- Died: 14 May 2023 (aged 86) Vunapope, Papua New Guinea
- Motto: CARITAS ET JUSTITIA
- Coat of arms: Karl Hesse's coat of arms

Styles of Karl Hesse
- Reference style: His Excellency; The Most Reverend
- Spoken style: Your Excellency
- Religious style: Archbishop

Karl Bernhard Hesse MSC, MBE (15 August 1936 – 14 May 2023) was a German prelate of the Catholic Church. He served as the auxiliary bishop of Rabaul from 1978 to 1980, bishop of Kavieng from 1980 to 1990, and Archbishop of Rabaul from 1990 to 2011.

== Ministry ==
Hesse was appointed auxiliary bishop of Rabaul on 27 April 1978. He was then appointed bishop of Kavieng on 24 October 1980. Hesse was appointed Archbishop of Rabaul on 7 July 1990 and was sworn in on 16 September 1991.

Between 1994 and 1996, and then again between 2002 and 2005, he was the President of the Catholic Bishops Conference of Papua New Guinea and Solomon Islands.

On 11 August 2011, Pope Benedict XVI announced that Hesse had resigned as Archbishop of Rabaul for reasons of age. He was succeeded by Francesco Panfilo, who had been his coadjutor for a year.

== Honours and awards ==
On his 52nd birthday in 1988, on the occasion of his silver jubilee as a priest and the tenth anniversary of his ordination as a bishop, Hesse received the Federal Cross of Merit with Ribbon. On 1 January 2002, he was made a Member of the Order of the British Empire (MBE) by Queen Elizabeth II and in January 2009 he was appointed Chief Grand Commander of the Papua New Guinea Government for 40 years of special services in action. Hesse was also awarded the Order of Logohu.

Catholic Church titles
Preceded by Albert-Leo Bundervoet	Archbishop of Rabaul; 1990–2011	Succeeded by Francesco Panfilo
Preceded by Alfred Matthew Stemper	Bishop of Kavieng; 1980–1990	Succeeded by Ambrose Kiapseni
Preceded by Venancio Celestino Orbe Uriarte	Titular Bishop of Naratcata; 1978–1980	Succeeded by Patrick Vincent Hurley
Preceded by —	Auxiliary Bishop of Rabaul; 1978–1980	Succeeded by —
