= Caritas Papua New Guinea =

Catholic charity organisation

- Abbreviation: Caritas PNG, CPNG
- Established: 1974
- Founder: Bishops Conference
- Type: Nonprofit
- Purpose: humanitarian relief, social justice, peacebuilding, development
- Location: Port Moresby, Papua New Guinea
- Origins: Catholic Social Teaching
- Services: social services, humanitarian aid, advocacy
- Official language: English
- Affiliations: Caritas Internationalis, Caritas Oceania
- Website: www.caritas.org.pg
- Formerly called: Catholic Commission for Justice, Peace and Development (CCJPD)

Caritas Papua New Guinea is a Papuan not-for-profit organisation. It is the social arm of the Catholic Church in Papua New Guinea and works in the fields of humanitarian relief, social justice, peacebuilding and development.

Caritas Papua New Guinea is a member of both Caritas Oceania and Caritas Internationalis.

== History and structure ==
Caritas Papua New Guinea was founded in 1974 by the local Bishops Conference. At the time, it was called the Catholic Commission for Justice, Peace and Development (CCJPD). It operated under this name until 2001 when it changed its name to Caritas Papua New Guinea.

In 2013, the office building of the national Caritas in Port Moresby was destroyed in a fire.

The organisation has a nationwide reach with a national office established in the capital of Port Moresby. The structure follows the structure of the Catholic Church, i.e. there is a Caritas coordinator in 18 out of the 19 dioceses in the country who coordinate the activities at a local level.

The organisation funds its activities through local fundraising efforts, notably through its annual Lenten Appeal, a fundraising campaign during the time of lent. It also receives financial support from the global Caritas Internationalis confederation, including from Caritas Australia and Caritas New Zealand, as well as from donors such as the UNDP.

== Work ==
The work of Caritas Papua New Guinea focuses on promoting social justice, peace and human development in line with Catholic Social Teaching. The organisation aims to address structural causes of poverty, inequality, and marginalisation, and to serve as a voice for vulnerable and underserved communities. CPNG serves all people regardless of social status or religious affiliation.

Programmes include electoral education and awareness through a nationwide initiative to promote free and fair elections, implemented through all 19 diocesan Caritas offices. Another significant initiative is the prevention against sorcery accusation-related violence, conducted in collaboration with the Diocese of Wabag. This programme also supports survivors through rescue, rehabilitation, and reintegration services.

Together with six other denominations, the Catholic Church and Caritas have partnered in the "Church Development Programme", funded by the Australian government. This programmes aims to build the institutional capacity of the country's churches to engage as civil society actors and to improve their contribution to health, education and social service delivery in Papua New Guinea.

Caritas Papua New Guinea has also been implementing various water, sanitation and hygiene programmes across the country and empowered local communities with training.

In times of crisis — such as after cyclones, landslides, or the COVID-19 pandemic — CPNG delivers emergency humanitarian assistance. This includes the provision of shelter, food, and hygiene supplies during the initial response phase, followed by support for longer-term recovery efforts such as home reconstruction and agricultural rehabilitation.

In addition, the national Caritas office engages in advocacy work in close coordination with sister agencies across the Caritas Oceania network. Key areas of focus include addressing the impacts of climate change and public debt, as well as promoting environmental protection and sustainable development policies.
