= Arnold Orowae =

Papua New Guinean Roman Catholic bishop (1955–2024)

His Excellency Arnold Orowae
- Bishop of Wabag
- Archdiocese: Mount Hagen
- Diocese: Wabag
- Installed: 30 June 2008
- Term ended: 27 December 2024
- Predecessor: Hermann Raich
- Successor: Vacant
- Previous posts: Auxiliary Bishop of Wabag and Titular Bishop of Gisipa (1999–2004); Coadjutor Bishop of Wabag (2004–2008)

Orders
- Ordination: 14 December 1983
- Consecration: 4 March 2000 by Hermann Raich

Personal details
- Born: 15 June 1955 Aiopa, Territory of Papua and New Guinea
- Died: 27 December 2024 (aged 69) Wabag, Papua New Guinea

Arnold Orowae (15 June 1955 – 27 December 2024) was a Papua New Guinean clergyman who was bishop for the Roman Catholic Diocese of Wabag. He was appointed in 2008.

Between 2014 and 2017, he was the President of the Catholic Bishops Conference of Papua New Guinea and Solomon Islands.

Orowae died on 27 December 2024, at the age of 69.

== See also ==
- Catholic Church in Papua New Guinea

Catholic Church titles
Preceded by Hermann Raich	Bishop of Wabag; 2008–2024	Succeeded by Vacant
Preceded by Gerald Barbarito	Titular Bishop of Gisipa; 1999–2004	Succeeded by Eduardo Pinheiro da Silva
Preceded by —	Auxiliary Bishop of Wabag; 1999–2004	Succeeded by —
