= Felice Tantardini =

Venerable Felice Tantardini P.I.M.E.
- Born: 28 June 1898; Introbio, Como, Kingdom of Italy
- Died: 23 March 1991 (aged 92); Taunggyi, Shan, Myanmar
- Venerated in: Roman Catholic Church
- Attributes: Anvil; Rosary
- Patronage: Missionaries; Blacksmiths; Tradesmen

Felice Tantardini (28 June 1898 - 23 March 1991) was an Italian Roman Catholic religious brother from the Pontifical Institute for Foreign Missions (PIME) who served in the Burmese missions.

Tantardini worked as an apprentice blacksmith under his older brother before he enlisted in the Italian armed forces after World War I broke out in Europe. He served in the front lines but the German forces captured him and moved him from camp to camp before he and some others managed to escape their captors. He resumed his work after his return to his home province but soon set himself on entering the missions, after reading old magazines that detailed the work missionaries did. He entered PIME in 1921 and a short while later in 1922 was sent to the Burmese missions where he would spend the next seven decades.

Tantardini became beloved in the missions and travelled either on foot or horseback to reach the various missions, with some located in the jungles or mountains. He became known as the "Blacksmith of God" for his work as a blacksmith in the local communities but also did work as an electrician or carpenter in order to cater to the needs of the mission communities. He toned down his work after he turned 85 when his superiors asked him to retire and he spent this time continuing to visit at a less frequent rate and reciting rosaries often in his free time.

His death in 1991 prompted calls for his beatification in 1994. Initial steps to activate the cause came following this before the cause launched in mid-2000; he became titled as a Servant of God as a result. The cause culminated on 11 June 2019 after Pope Francis signed a decree that acknowledged that Tantardini had practiced heroic virtue throughout his life.

== Life ==
Felice Tantardini was born on 28 June 1898 in Introbio in the Como province as the sixth of eight children to Battista Tantardini and Maria Magni. His parents were devout and would recite the rosary each evening together with their children. His brothers included Giuseppe and Primo and a sister was named Anna.

He finished third grade twice in order to improve his basic education and in 1908 started to work as an apprentice blacksmith under his older brother Giuseppe in his workshop. In 1911 his father died in a tragic accident – a flashflood that overran his electrician workshop that had been built on the bank of the Troggia Waterfall. Tantardini later recalled that his father's bones were not found until 1914. In 1915 he began work at the Ansaldo Power Plant in Genova. He enlisted in the Italian armed forces after World War I broke out in Europe and was exempted from active service since he worked in a corporation that was war-supporting and contributed to the Italian war effort. The Italian defeat at Caporetto on 24 October 1917 saw him recalled and after two months of training he was sent to the front lines in January 1918. But just 48 hours later the German soldiers captured him and 60 others and led them to Vittorio Veneto where he was assigned to work on the railroads. He suffered from hunger and the cold weather that affected his health. He was relocated often from one concentration camp to another until he managed to escape his captors; he was sent to Udine and Gorizia before being sent to Belgrade in Serbia. During his time as a prisoner of war he slept on the ground and had two meals consisting of beetroots cooked in water, with transgressions prompting a whipping for prisoners who angered the guards. He planned his escape in December 1918 alongside four others, crawling through a drainage channel before reaching Greece and then returning home. In June 1919 he arrived home via a ship to Taranto and a train ride to Lecco. He spent just over two weeks recovering before being sent for three months to take the Greek island of Kalymnos .

He returned to his home province and to his work as a blacksmith, and then as an electrician with the Camisolo Mine Limited corporation. During this time he began to read copies of The Catholic Missions detailing the work undertaken in the missions, after his little sister Anna kept them aside just for him. This matured in his mind the desire to enter the missions himself. He began dreaming about the missions at the time his boss thought about having him wed one of his three daughters. His mother supported his decision but warned him to make sure that his choice was genuine and not just a passing phase. On 20 September 1921 he entered the Pontifical Institute for Foreign Missions in Milan and on 24 June 1922 received the religious garb (from the superior general Giuseppe Armanasco) before receiving the mission crucifix on 15 August (received alongside ten others with Vincenzo Marcuzzi and Sandro Perico going with him to the missions). Ten months after having entered PIME he was sent to the Burmese missions as a religious brother. He departed from Venice on 2 September 1922 and after two weeks of travelling spent time in Bombay in India. From there he went to Calcutta, Rangoon, and then to Toungoo by train.

== Burmese missions ==
This began what would be seven decades working in the Burmese missions. Tantardini was enthusiastic about being able to contribute to the local communities and also being able to contribute to proclaiming the Gospel. He sometimes was asked to do catechesis for children and older people, though he was better known for working with anvil and hammer as a blacksmith, and became known as the "Blacksmith of God". He also did work from time to time with lepers. Clement Vismara – whom Tantardini knew – once said that "Brother Felice's weakness is the pipe", for he was known to smoke with the pipe more often than not.

In Leikthò, Burma, in 1924 he was struck with severe abdominal pains but the nearest hospital in Toungoo was over 30 miles from where he was. The single possible method for taking him there was on a shoulder stretcher and as he was loaded on it he insisted on going to the chapel to the altar dedicated to the Blessed Mother to ask for her intercession. He ended up getting out of the stretcher with his pain gone and threw his cane down exclaiming that she had healed him. The people called this event a miracle.

During the Japanese bombings after their invasion during World War II, he almost died several times but would tend to the people affected during this time despite his own fear at the bombings. He returned to his homeland only once, April 1956 to January 1957, in order to rest and regain his strength. While there he learnt the girl his old boss wanted him to marry had died without having ever married. He visited Rome where he first met his niece, then a novice in a convent. On 1 May 1956 he travelled to Saint Peter's Basilica to see Pope Pius XII at a public event alongside two priest companions, and also visited several Roman churches. From Rome he went to Milan to see his siblings and was ill in Milan for a brief time.

Upon his return to Burma he was first assigned to the Toungoo mission but moved from mission to mission whenever and wherever he was called to do his work. He travelled long distances often on foot or horseback under the hot sun or in torrential downpours and he sometimes came across guerilla groups, or even wild beasts and animals such as snakes and tigers. He became noted for his constant efforts to improve the lives of local communities: he constructed churches and convents as well as schools and orphanages. Tantardini also oversaw the construction of hospitals and bridges to help improve the local infrastructure. He did work too as a carpenter or plumber and also did farming and orchard gardening while also working as a bricklayer. In 1973 the Italian Government awarded him the title "Master of Labor" due to his "contributing to honoring Italian work abroad".

His superiors – including Bishop Giovanni Battista Gobbato (also from PIME) – asked Tantardini to retire after he turned 85 since his superiors believed he was pushing himself too much and was growing too frail. It was during this retirement period that his bishop asked him to write about his own life. He did so, recounting his works in the missions and how he coped during the Japanese invasion and bombings during World War II, while also writing about the struggles between the different ethnic groups. His retirement did not see him cease working for he continued to help people in local communities. The priest Father Mariano once said that Tantardini was "enthusiastic about his work, and his infectious enthusiasm about the work on hand would become contagious and affect all those who worked with him". Mariano also referred to Tantardini as "serene", and as one who could sometimes be seen "joking around" with others.

Tantardini died on 23 March 1991; he had been ill for some time and in his final months could no longer stand. His remains were buried in the garden of the disabled center Holy Infant Jesus in the Payaphyu suburb. His tomb became a place for pilgrimage after his death with miracles reported at the tomb.

== Beatification process ==
His death prompted insistent calls for a beatification process to be activated in 1994, and initial steps were taken in the time after to ensure the cause could be opened. Further steps were taken in 1999. The cause was introduced on 23 May 2000 after the Congregation for the Causes of Saints issued the official "nihil obstat (no objections to the cause) edict and titled Tantardini as a Servant of God. The diocesan process for the cause was inaugurated in the Taunggyi archdiocese under Archbishop Matthias U Shwe on 2 August 2001 who also closed it sometime later. The documentation and witness testimonies (gathered from people in Taunggyi and Milan) were sent to the C.C.S. in Rome for additional assessment; the C.C.S. validated the diocesan process on 28 January 2005 as having adhered to their rules for conducting diocesan processes.

The postulator (the officials leading and coordinating the cause) compiled and submitted the Positio dossier to the C.C.S. in 2011 for evaluation. In June 2016 the PIME Superior General Father Ferruccio Brambillasca met with the then-C.C.S. Prefect Cardinal Angelo Amato to discuss the current state of the cause. Amato sent him a letter not long after telling Brambillasca that the Positio would be examined in the first half of 2018. The nine theologians issued their unanimous approval of the cause on 22 May 2018. The C.C.S. cardinal and bishop members approved the cause sometime later. Tantardini became titled as Venerable on 11 June 2019 after Pope Francis signed a decree that acknowledged the fact that Tantardini had practiced heroic virtue throughout his life.

The first postulator for the cause was Piero Ghetto (until his death in 2018) and the current postulator since 2018 is the PIME priest Giovanni Musi.
