= Diocese of Vanimo =

Latin Catholic diocese in Papua New Guinea

Coordinates: 2.6831°S 141.3032°E

Diocese of Vanimo Dioecesis Uanimitana
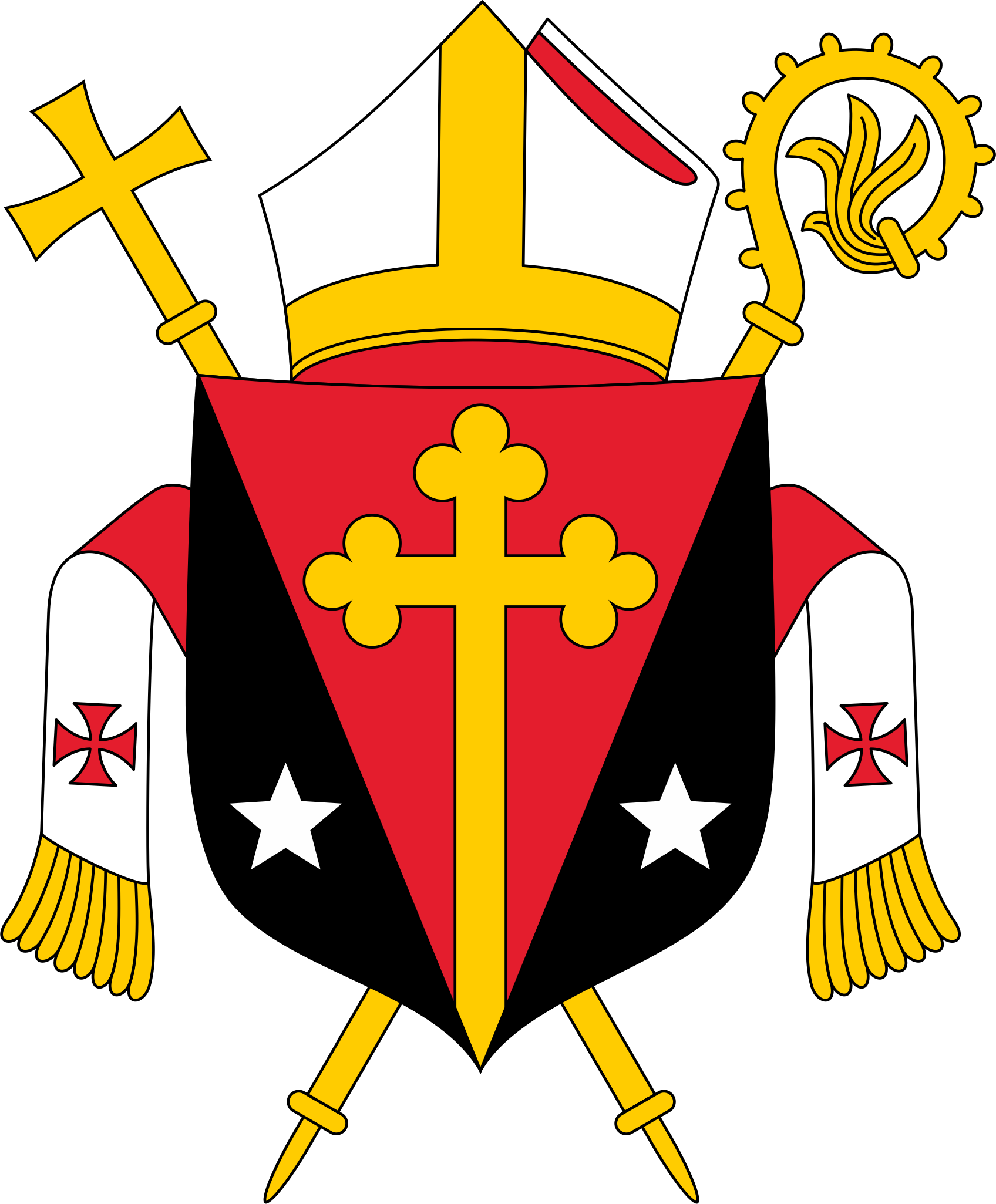
- Coat of arms

Location
- Country: Papua New Guinea
- Territory: West Sepik
- Metropolitan: Archdiocese of Madang

Statistics
- Area: 26,000 km^{2} (10,000 sq mi)
- Population: Total; Catholics: (as of 2015); 111,000; 37,765 (7.6%)
- Parishes: 13

Information
- Denomination: Catholic Church
- Sui iuris church: Latin Church
- Rite: Roman Rite
- Established: 15 November 1966
- Cathedral: Holy Cross Pro-Cathedral
- Patron saint: The Holy Cross
- Secular priests: 26

Current leadership
- Pope: Leo XIV
- Bishop: Francis Meli, JCL
- Bishops emeritus: Cesare Bonivento, P.I.M.E.

The Diocese of Vanimo is a Latin Catholic suffragan diocese of the Metropolitan Archdiocese of Madang in Papua New Guinea, and depends on the Congregation for the Evangelization of Peoples.

Its cathedral episcopal see is the Holy Cross Pro-cathedral, in Vanimo in the province of West Sepik (Sandaun).

== Statistics ==
As per 2015, it pastorally served 37,765 Catholics (34.0% of 111,000 total population) on 26,000 km² in 13 parishes and 96 missions with 26 priests (8 diocesan, 18 religious), 43 lay religious (20 brothers, 23 sisters) and 14 seminarians.

== History ==
- It was erected in 1963.09.13 as Apostolic Vicariate of Vanimo / Uanimitanus (Latin adjective), on territory split off from the then Apostolic Vicariate of Aitape (now a diocese)
- Promoted on 1966.11.15 as Diocese of Vanimo / Uanimitan(us) (Latin).

== Ordinaries ==
(all Roman rite, initially foreign members of missionary congregations)

Apostolic Prefect of Vanimo

- Paschal Sweeney, Passionists (C.P.) (born Australia) (1963.09.20 – 1966.11.15 see below)

Suffragan Bishops of Vanimo

- Paschal Sweeney, C.P. (see above 1966.11.15 – retired 1979.09.22), died 1981
- John Etheridge, C.P. (born Australia) (1980.04.24 – retired 1989.02.07), died 2002
  - Apostolic Administrator Father David Wilkie, C.P. (1989 – 1991.12.21), no other prelature
- Cesare Bonivento, Pontifical Institute for Foreign Missions (P.I.M.E.) (born Italy) (1991.12.21 – retired 2018.02.05)
- Francis Meli (first native incumbent) (2018.02.05 – ...).

== See also ==
- List of Catholic Dioceses in Papua New Guinea

== Sources and External links ==
- GCatholic, with Google satellite HQ picture - data for all sections
- "Diocese of Vanimo". Catholic-Hierarchy.
