= Hermann Raich =

Catholic bishop

Hermann Raich SVD
- Bishop of Wabag
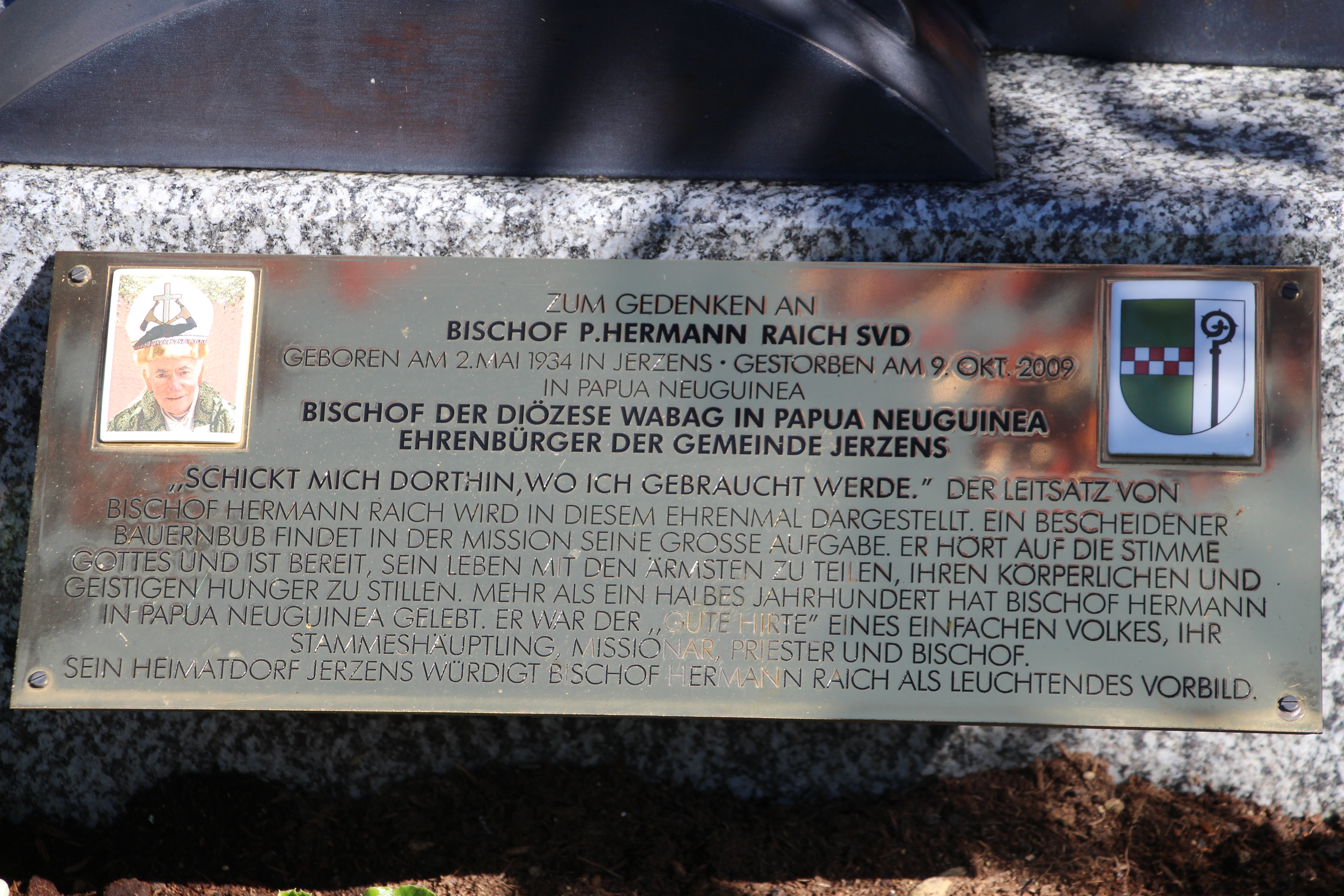
- Plakette Hermann Raich, Jerzens
- Church: Catholic Church
- Diocese: Diocese of Wabag
- In office: 8 March 1982 – 30 June 2008
- Predecessor: Diocese erected
- Successor: Arnold Orowae

Orders
- Ordination: 29 April 1962
- Consecration: 29 April 1982 by George Elmer Bernarding

Personal details
- Born: 2 May 1934 Jerzens, Tyrol, Federal State of Austria
- Died: 9 October 2009 (aged 75) Wabag, Enga Province, Papua New Guinea

Hermann Raich (2 May 1934 – 9 October 2009) was the first Roman Catholic bishop of the Roman Catholic Diocese of Wabag in Papua New Guinea.

Born in Jerzens, Austria, Raich was ordained to the priesthood on 29 April 1962. On 8 March 1982, Pope John Paul II appointed Raich bishop, and he was ordained a bishop on 29 April 1982. Bishop Raich retired on 30 June 2008.
