= Antonio Riganti =

20th-century Italian Catholic priest

The Very Reverend Antonio Riganti VG, PIME
- Vicar General of the Diocese of Hong Kong
- Church: Roman Catholic Church
- See: Hong Kong
- Other posts: Vicar Delegate of Hong Kong (1934-1942); Diocesan Administrator of Hong Kong (1951); Rector of St. Joseph's Church (1927-1932, 1934-1942); Rector of St. Margaret's Church (1950-1961); Procurator of PIME (1950, 1961-1965)

Orders
- Ordination: 18 March 1916

Personal details
- Born: 27 October 1893 Sesto Calende, Varese, Italy
- Died: 20 July 1965 (aged 71) St. Paul's Hospital, Causeway Bay, Hong Kong
- Buried: St. Michael's Catholic Cemetery, Happy Valley, Hong Kong
- Denomination: Roman Catholic

Chinese name
- Traditional Chinese: 戴遐齡
- Simplified Chinese: 戴遐龄
Transcriptions
Standard Mandarin
- Hanyu Pinyin: Dài, Xiá Líng
Yue: Cantonese
- Jyutping: Daai3, Haa4 Ling4

Ordination history of Antonio Riganti
History
Priestly ordination
- Date: March 18, 1916

Styles of Antonio Riganti
- Reference style: The Very Reverend
- Informal style: Father

Antonio Riganti, PIME (Chinese: 戴遐齡, 21 October 1893 – 20 July 1965) was an Italian Roman Catholic priest of the Pontifical Institute for Foreign Missions who served as the Vicar General of the Diocese of Hong Kong.

== Biography ==
=== Early life ===
On 27 October 1893, Antonio Riganti was born in Sesto Calende, Varese, a town near Milan, Italy.

=== Priestly ministry ===
He entered the Milan Archdiocesan seminary in 1905, and later joined the Pontifical Institute for Foreign Missions in 1913. He was ordained priest on 18 March 1916.

He was first sent to Albania to serve as a military chaplain during World War I.

Riganti arrived in Hong Kong in January 1920. His first assignment was the choir master to the Cathedral. In 1923, he was assigned to teach in the seminary in Hong Kong.

He became Rector of St. Joseph's Church in Garden Road in 1927; he held this post for over 21 years.

Riganti was recalled to Milan as the Assistant of the PIME Superior General in September 1948, but he was permitted to return to Hong Kong in November of the same year, where he became the Rector of St. Margaret's Church in Happy Valley, and the Procurator of PIME in Hong Kong.

=== Vicar General and Diocesan Administrator ===
After the death of the Bishop of Hong Kong, Enrico Valtorta, on 4 September 1951, while the Coadjutor Bishop of Hong Kong, Lorenzo Bianchi, was being under arrest by the Communist Government in China, Antonio Riganti was appointed the Diocesan Administrator of Hong Kong, with the full authority and power which is equivalent to a Diocesan Bishop by the Sacred Congregation for the Propagation of the Faith.

When Bianchi was released in December 1952, he confirmed the appointment of Riganti as the Vicar General of Hong Kong.

=== Music ===
Riganti was endowed with musical talent since childhood, and composed several liturgical hymns. He also was frequently consulted by other composers in Hong Kong.

=== Later years and Death ===
In September 1959, Riganti resigned his position as Vicar General, on grounds of declining health. In September 1961, he resigned as the Rector of St. Margaret’s Church due to his serious illness.

Riganti died on 20 July 1965 in St. Paul’s Hospital, Causeway Bay, due to lung cancer. He was 71 year old. His remains were buried in St. Michael's Catholic Cemetery, Happy Valley, Hong Kong.
