= St. Michael's Catholic Cemetery =

Cemetery in Happy Valley, Hong Kong

Coordinates: 22.2729839°N 114.1784917°E

- Traditional Chinese: 天主教聖彌額爾墳場
- Simplified Chinese: 天主教圣弥额尔坟场
Transcriptions

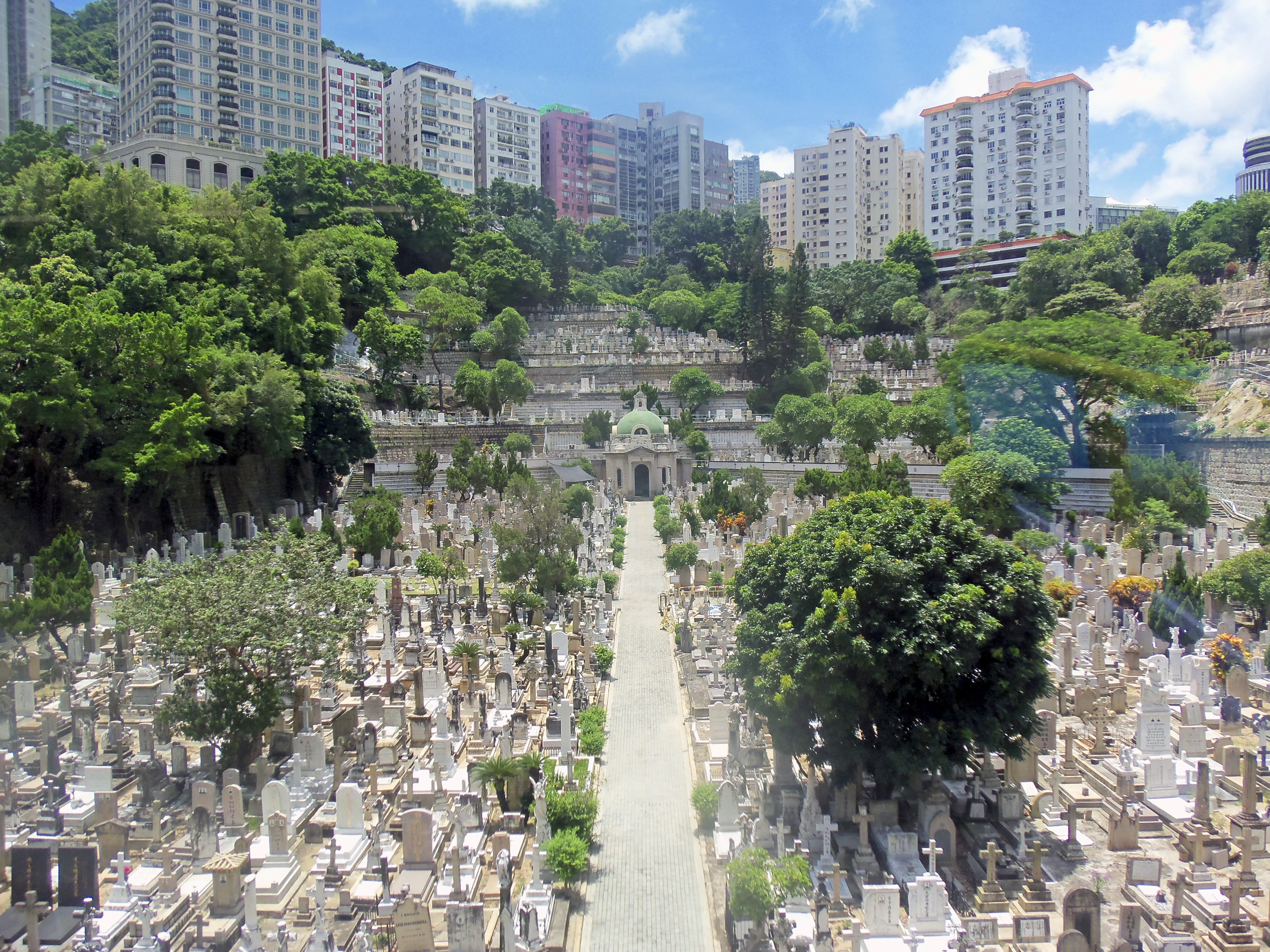
St. Michael's Catholic Cemetery

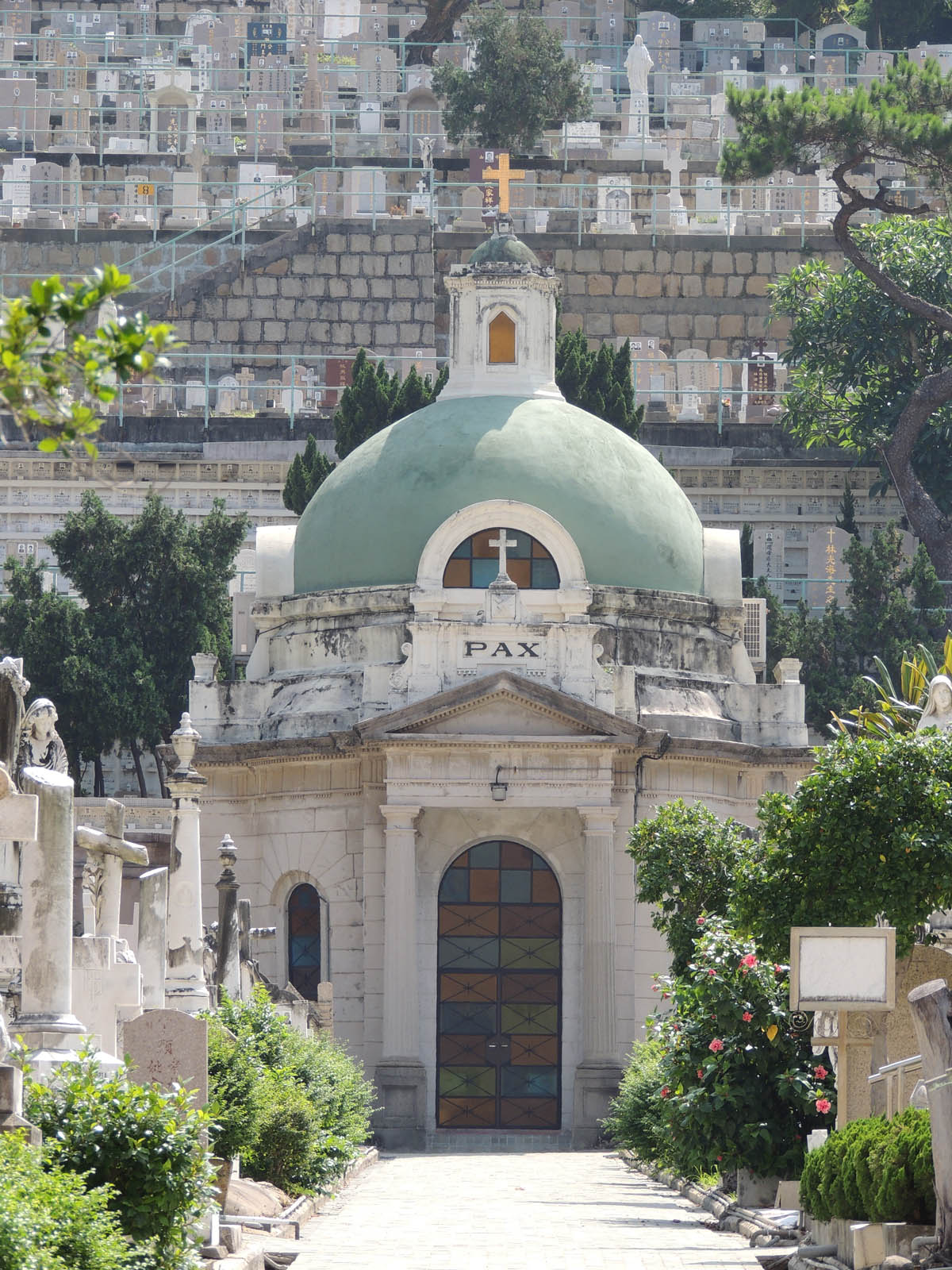
Chapel

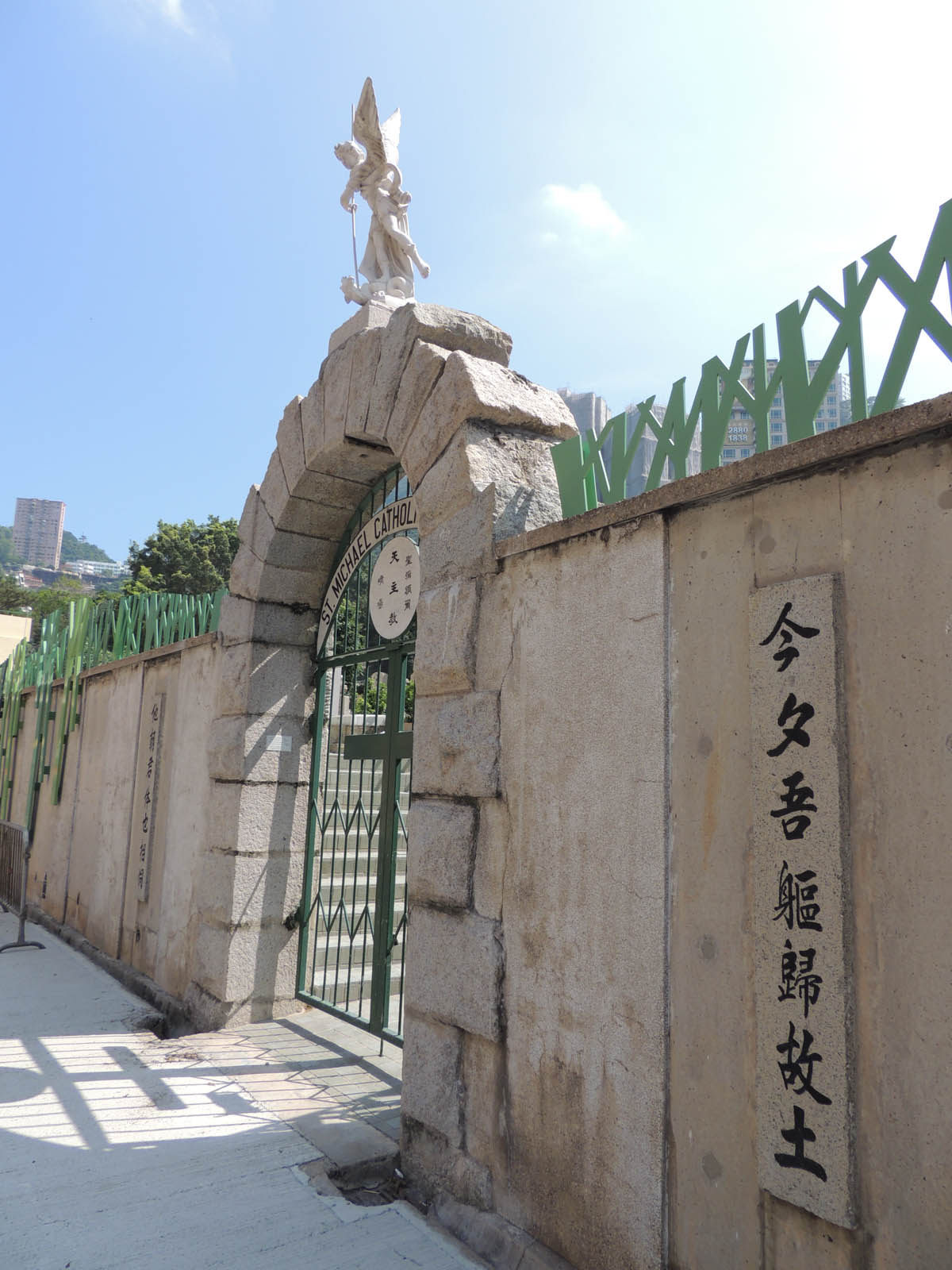
Entrance gate

St. Michael's Catholic Cemetery is a private cemetery located in Happy Valley, on Hong Kong Island, Hong Kong. It is managed by the Catholic Diocese of Hong Kong together with Holy Cross Catholic Cemetery, Cape Collinson and St. Raphael's Catholic Cemetery, Cheung Sha Wan. It is also the oldest Catholic cemetery in Hong Kong.

== Notable burials ==
=== Diocese bishops ===
- Cardinal John Baptist Wu (1925–2002), 5th Bishop and first Cardinal of Hong Kong, his remains was exhumed in September 2022 and transferred to the Crypt of the Cathedral of the Immaculate Conception
- Bishop Michael Yeung (1945–2019), 8th Bishop of Hong Kong

=== Clergy ===
- Fr. Alfred Deignan SJ (1927–2018), former principal of Wah Yan College
- Fr. Harold Naylor SJ (1931–2018), former teacher of Kowloon Wah Yan College
- Fr. George Zee SJ (1940–2025), former supervisor of Kowloon Wah Yan College
- Fr. Antonio Riganti PIME (1893-1965), former Vicar General and Diocesan Administrator of Hong Kong
- Fr. Enea Tapella PIME (1929-1977), Italian Missionary Priest of the Pontifical Institute for Foreign Missions
- Bishop Adolph John Paschang MM (1895-1968), Maryknoll Missionary and former Bishop of Jiangmen
- Bishop Charles Joseph Lemaire MEP (1900-1995), former Vicar Apostolic of Jilin and former Superior General of Paris Foreign Missions Society

=== Others ===
- Harold Lee (1910–1980), co-founder of Television Broadcasts Limited
- William Mong GBS (1927–2010), founder and chairman of the Shun Hing Group
- Raymond Wu GBS (1936–2006), member of Hong Kong delegate to the National People's Congress
- Sir Harry Fang GBM, OBE, JP (1923–2009), co-founder of Hong Kong Society for Rehabilitation
- Peter Tsao CBE, (1933–2005), former Secretary for Administrative Services and Information and Secretary for Home Affairs
- Tang King Po (1879–1956), famous entrepreneur
- Linda Lin Dai (1934–1964), film actress

== See also ==
- List of cemeteries in Hong Kong
- Holy Cross Catholic Cemetery
