= Caritas Fiji =

Catholic charity organisation in Fiji

- Caritas Archdiocese of Suva
- Type: Nonprofit
- Purpose: social welfare, social justice
- Location: Suva, Fiji
- Origins: Catholic Social Teaching
- Services: social services, humanitarian aid
- Affiliations: Caritas Internationalis, Caritas Oceania
- Website: caritasfiji.org
- Formerly called: Caritas Archdiocese of Suva

Caritas Archdiocese of Suva, operating under the name Caritas Fiji, is a not-for-profit social welfare organisation in Fiji. It is the social arm of the Catholic Church in Fiji.

Caritas Fiji became a member of both Caritas Oceania and Caritas Internationalis in 2019.

== Work ==
Caritas Fiji works with local communities across the country, including through youth groups, to promote gender justice and support equality between men and women.

The organisation supports people in vulnerable situations and also responds to humanitarian needs when necessary. For example, following Cyclone Harold and Cyclone Yasa, Caritas Fiji provided emergency assistance such as food rations, clothing, and psychosocial support. In addition to its emergency response work, Caritas Fiji also engages in longer-term development initiatives. One such example includes the provision of water tanks to a maternity ward and a school in Navunibitu to improve access to clean water.

Caritas Fiji funds its activities through a combination of local fundraising and support from international donors. Past donors have included the ANZ Fiji Staff Foundation and the United States government.

The organisation is also involved in advocacy efforts, particularly on issues such as debt and climate change vulnerability in the Pacific. In this work, Caritas Fiji collaborates with partners including Caritas Oceania and Caritas Australia.
