= Abraham Than =

Burmese Roman Catholic bishop (1927–2025)

His Excellency Abraham Than
- Bishop Emeritus of Kengtung
- Archdiocese: Taunggyi
- Diocese: Kengtung
- Appointed: 19 September 1972
- Term ended: 2 October 2001
- Predecessor: Fernando Guercilena
- Successor: Peter Louis Cakü
- Previous posts: Auxiliary Bishop of Kengtung and Titular Bishop of Tortibulum (1968–1972)

Orders
- Ordination: 22 September 1957
- Consecration: 11 May 1969 by Sebastian U Shwe Yauk

Personal details
- Born: 21 September 1927 Mong Block, Burma, British India
- Died: 17 August 2025 (aged 97)
- Motto: Joyful things in life

Abraham Than (21 September 1927 – 17 August 2025) was a Burmese Roman Catholic prelate.

== Life and work ==
Than was ordained a priest on 22 September 1957. Pope Paul VI appointed him auxiliary bishop of Kengtung and titular bishop of Tortibulum on 19 December 1968. The Bishop of Toungoo, Sebastian U Shwe Yauk, consecrated him bishop on 11 May of the following year; Co-consecrators were Aloysius Moses U Ba Khim, Archbishop of Mandalay, and Joseph Mahn Erie, Bishop of Bassein.

On 19 September 1972, he was appointed Bishop of Kengtung. He resigned from his office on 2 October 2001.

Than died on 17 August 2025, at the age of 97.

Catholic Church titles
Preceded by Fernando Guercilena	Bishop of Kengtung; 1972–2001	Succeeded by Peter Louis Cakü
Preceded by First	Titular Bishop of Tortibulum; 1968–1972	Succeeded by Sergio Adolfo Govi
