= Enea Tapella =

20-century Italian Roman Catholic Missionary Priest

The Reverend Enea Tapella PIME
- Priest of the Pontifical Institute for Foreign Missions
- Church: Roman Catholic Church
- See: Hong Kong

Orders
- Ordination: June 26, 1955

Personal details
- Born: September 12, 1929 Vanzaghello, Italy
- Died: April 5, 1977 (aged 47) Queen Mary Hospital, Hong Kong
- Buried: St. Michael's Catholic Cemetery, Happy Valley, Hong Kong

Chinese name
- Traditional Chinese: 達碑立
- Simplified Chinese: 达碑立
Transcriptions
Standard Mandarin
- Hanyu Pinyin: Dá Bēi Lì
Yue: Cantonese
- Jyutping: Daat6 Bei1 Lap6

Styles of Enea Tapella
- Reference style: The Reverend
- Informal style: Father

Ordination history of Enea Tapella
History
Priestly ordination
- Date: June 26, 1955

Enea Tapella, PIME (Chinese: 達碑立, 12 September 1929 – 5 April 1977) was an Italian Roman Catholic missionary priest of the Pontifical Institute for Foreign Missions who has served in the Diocese of Hong Kong for 20 years.

== Biography ==
On 12 September 1929, Enea Tapella was born in Vanzaghello, a town in the Province of Milan, Italy.

He entered Milan's Archdiocesan Seminary in December 1942, then he joined the Pontifical Institute for Foreign Missions on 29 September 1947.

He was ordained priest on 26 June 1955, after his priestly ordination, he was sent to serve the PIME's Minor Seminary in Genoa.

In June 1957, he was sent to Hong Kong to serve, and he arrived on 26 November in the same year.

After his arrival to Hong Kong, he was assigned to serve the different parishes in Kowloon (such as St. Teresa Church and St. Francis of Assisi Church), during his service in the various parishes, he was actively engaged in missionary work to the sicks and handicapped people.

On 29 March 1957, Tapella was badly injured in a motorcycle accident.

Tapella died on 5 April, a week after the accident. He was 47.

== Memorial ==
Tapella's Funeral Mass was held on 7 April 1977 in St. Francis of Assisi Church in Shek Kip Mei, where he is serving as Assistant Parish Priest until his death.

His remains were buried in St. Michael's Catholic Cemetery in Happy Valley, where he later re-interred to the columbarium located at the back of the cemetery's chapel.

In 1987, "Via Padre Enea Tapella" street in Vanzaghello was named in his honor.
