= Catholic Church in Papua New Guinea =

The Catholic Church in Papua New Guinea is part of the worldwide Catholic Church, under the spiritual leadership of the Pope in Rome. Papua New Guinea has approximately two million Catholic adherents, approximately 27 percent of the country's total population.

The country is divided into 19 dioceses, including four archdioceses.

The work of the bishops is coordinated through the Catholic Bishops Conference of Papua New Guinea and Solomon Islands.

== History ==
=== Pre-colonial period ===
During his pontificate (1831–1846), Pope Gregory XVI (1765–1846) founded the Apostolic Vicariate of Melanesia and Micronesia on 19 July 1844 and entrusted it first to the Marists (1845–1850) and then to the Milan missionaries (PIME) from 1850 to 1855. In 1845, the first French Marists arrived in the vicariate to begin missionary work under the leadership of a Marist bishop, Jean-Baptiste Épalle (1808–1845). On 2 December 1845, Bishop Épalle, accompanied by seven priests and six brothers, reached San Cristobal, one of the larger islands in the Solomon Islands, later colonised by Great Britain and henceforth called British Solomon Islands. After the missionary group was attacked on 16 December 1845 on Santa Isabel, the Marists had to withdraw again from Melanesia. Bishop Épalle died of his injuries.

In 1847, the newly ordained Bishop Jean-Georges Collomb (1816–1848) undertook a second attempt to establish a mission in the Vicariate of Melanesia. This time, Woodlark Island (Murua) was selected as the mission territory. Woodlark Island lay in what is now Milne Bay Province and formed part of British New Guinea from 1884. One year later, in 1848, a second Marist station was established on Rooke Island (Siassi or Umboi), belonging to the territory of German New Guinea, nowadays Papua New Guinea. From 1884 onward, the Marists hoped Rooke Island’s strategic location would enable the mission to establish new stations on the New Guinea mainland and on nearby New Britain and New Ireland but the plan was not realised. Bishop Collomb died there of malaria after only a few weeks. The Marists withdrew to Woodlark in May 1849 and asked the Propaganda Fide to release them from this difficult mission field. “Later in 1852, seven Italian Milan missionaries arrived to relieve the frustrated Marists” (Pech 1985, 22). The seven Italian missionaries from the newly founded (1850) Milan Mission Society for Foreign Missions (later called: Pontificio Istituto Missioni Estere – PIME) came to Woodlark and Umboi, since the Propaganda Fide had asked them to take over the missionary work in the vacant vicariate. However, the highly motivated but inexperienced Italian missionaries did not find the conditions conducive for survival and left Melanesia in 1855—as had, for similar reasons, their predecessors. The last surviving Italian missionary, Fr Giovanni Mazzucconi (1826–1855, beatified on 19 February 1984), was the victim of a raid by Woodlark Islanders at Milne Bay in 1855.

All pre-colonial Catholic attempts to evangelise the indigenous population and establish permanent missionary activity had failed in New Guinea and the Solomon Islands. The vicariate remained vacant from 1855 to 1880. Abbé René-Marie Lannuzel (1848–1898), a French secular priest from the Bretagne, France, was the first Catholic priest to return to the vicariate after 25 years of vacancy, as an “apostolic missionary” after landing on New Ireland in October 1880. Father Lannuzel came as chaplain for the settlers of the “free colony of New France”, a colony planned and started by the French nobleman Charles du Breil, Marquis de Rays (1832–1893). When the project failed in 1881 Lannuzel remained on Matupit Island and could with contact To Litur, a Tolai chief from Beridni on East New Britain. To Litur was proud to welcome the French missionary, since his rival, To Koropa, at the neighbouring village had only one Methodist teacher from Fiji. Now Lannuzel could devote himself entirely to the conversion of the natives. He began to teach some 200 adults and their children from To Litur’s clan, teaching the catechism and preparing them for baptism. On 12 and 13 July 1881, Lannuzel baptised 76 Tolai children.

The London Missionary Society (LMS) started a mission on the South Papuan coast in 1871. The Wesleyan Methodists (WMM) arrived in 1875 in the Bismarck Archipelago and started their missionary work on the Gazelle Peninsula on New Briain Island in 1875. The Catholic Sacred Heart Mission (MSC) settled in 1882 on New Britain. On15 September 1882, three MSC priests—Fr André Navarre (1836–1912), Fr Théophile Cramaille (1843–1896) and Fr Mesmin Fromm (1860–1923)—saw for the first time Melanesian land when passing through Bougainville. Four days later, on 19 September, they landed in Port Breton Harbour to visit the remains of the abandoned colony of New France on New Ireland Island. After first contacts with the inhabitants of the area around Port Breton and some attempts to give catechesis to local people, the ship turned off for New Britain. However, due to wind conditions, their landing in Blanche Bay, near the island of Matupit, failed until 28 September 1882. The next day, the feast day of the Holy Archangel Michael, the missionaries went ashore. From then on, 29 September 1882 has been considered the official founding day of the Sacred Heart Mission in the Pacific.

=== Colonial times ===
The first Catholic mass was celebrated on the Louisiade Islands, probably Sideia Island, by the chaplain to Torres's expedition in 1606.

The Italian missionary Fr Giovanni Battista Mazzucconi was martyred on Woodlark Island in Milne Bay Province in 1845.

German missionaries of the Society of the Divine Word founded missions on the Sepik River and northern coastal areas from the 1890s. The Prefecture Apostolic of Kaiserwilhelmsland comprised 12 mission stations along the northern coast. Bishop Louis Couppé had success in East New Britain and acted against the indigenous slave trade. Five male missionaries and five nuns were massacred in the Baining region of New Britain in 1904, leading to reprisals by the German colonial authorities.

Many Rabaul Chinese were Catholic. St Theresa's Yang Ching School was founded there in 1924.

In 1995, Pope John Paul II beatified Peter To Rot, a catechist and New Guinea native from New Britain blessed for his martyrdom when in 1945 he refused to embrace polygamy and was killed by occupying Japanese forces. His canonization was approved in 2025. Many other local Catholics and missionaries suffered death, torture and imprisonment at the hands of the Japanese. Forty-five missionaries were massacred on the Japanese destroyer Akikaze in 1943; among those killed was Bishop Josef Lörks. Japanese forces destroyed churches during their occupation. The Catholic mission and cathedral at Alexishafen near Madang were destroyed by American bombing in 1943 but the mission was rebuilt after the War. Funds to rebuild the cathedral were raised by the American airmen who bombed it. In 1944, American planes attacked a Japanese ship carrying prisoners of war, which resulted in the death of Bishop Franz Wolf and fifty-nine other Catholics.

In Papua, the Missionaries of the Sacred Heart began a mission at Yule Island in 1885. Bishop Alain de Boismenu, Vicar Apostolic of Papua from 1908 to 1945, established missionary and charitable activities based on the mission at Yule Island. He was assisted by Filipino catechists. In 1918 he founded an indigenous order of nuns, the Handmaids of the Lord, which is still active. The French mystic and visionary Marie-Thérèse Augustine Noblet (fr), whom de Boismenu exorcised in France in 1921, accompanied him to Papua and assisted at the mission until her death in 1930. Noblet acted as mentor to the first indigenous priest and bishop from Papua New Guinea, Louis Vangeke. Her story made a profound spiritual impression on the Australian poet James McAuley, who visited Yule Island in 1949 and converted to Catholicism.

Fr William Ross accompanied early expeditions of the Leahy brothers to the Highlands and established a mission at Mount Hagen in 1934.

A Marist mission on Bougainville, beginning in 1901, was very successful and the majority of the population became Catholic. Bishop Thomas Wade secured strong support for the mission from Australia and the United States. The Japanese occupation caused major disruption, including the presumed execution of three Australian Marist Brothers by the Japanese. Expansion was rapid after the War, with schools constructed in Chabai and Kieta.

In 1966, the Bishop's Conference was established.

In 1967 the Australian ophthalmologist, Fr Frank Flynn, was appointed as Administrator of the Cathedral and Director of Catholic Health Services in Papua New Guinea. His efforts led to the foundation of a Medical Faculty at the University of Papua New Guinea. Nuns, especially those of the Daughters of Our Lady of the Sacred Heart and the Sisters of Mercy were very active in providing local health services. The mission hospitals developed into Catholic Church Health Services, which in 2016 ran five rural hospitals and 244 health facilities.

=== Since independence ===
Pope John Paul II visited Papua New Guinea in 1984 and 1995.

Catholics prominent in Papua New Guinea politics include Michael Somare, John Momis (who was a priest for many years) and Bernard Narokobi.

The Divine Word University at Madang was established by Act of Parliament in 1996.

In 1974, the Bishops Conference established the Catholic Commission for Justice, Peace and Development (CCJPD), which changed its name to Caritas Papua New Guinea in 2001. It acts as the humanitarian relief, social justice, peacebuilding, and development arm of the Church.

John Ribat, the Archbishop of Port Moresby since 2008, was created the first cardinal from Papua New Guinea in 2016.

Social issues of current concern to the Church include domestic violence and sorcery and climate change.

Pope Francis visited Papua New Guinea from 6 to 9 September 2024.

== 2025 Constitutional amendment and impact ==
In March 2025, Papua New Guinea's Parliament amended the constitution by an 80-4 vote to formally declare the country a Christian nation, acknowledging the Trinity in the preamble and recognizing the Bible as a national symbol.

The Catholic Bishops' Conference opposed the amendment as unnecessary, arguing the constitution already provided Christian foundation. Bishop Rozario Menezes warned it could pose long-term risks to religious freedom and minority faith protections.

One year after passage, the amendment had limited practical effect on parish life. However, bishops identified concerns including removal of church tax exemptions and disproportionate representation of Seventh-day Adventist members in government positions. The Church maintained its work in education, health care, and social services while monitoring potential restrictions on institutional autonomy.

== See also ==
- List of Saints from Oceania
  - Martyrs of New Guinea
- List of Catholic dioceses in Papua New Guinea & Solomon Islands

== Literature ==
- Bruno Hagspiel: Along the Mission Trail. III. In New Guinea, Mission Press S.V.D, Techny, Illinois 1926, 270 pp.
- Anton Freitag: Glaubenssaat in Blut und Tränen. Die Missionen der Gesellschaft des Göttlichen Wortes in Asien, Afrika, Ozeanien u. Amerika am Vorabend des Zweiten Weltkrieges, ihre Leiden u. Schicksale in u. nach dem Kriege, dem neuen Missionsfrühling entgegen. Steyler Missionsbuchhandlung: Kaldenkirchen 1948, 446 S.
- Sixta Kasbauer: Die aus grosser Drangsal kommen. Ein Buch von Menschenwegen und Gotteswegen aus den Kriegsjahren der Steyler Neuguinea-Mission, Missionsdruckerei Steyl 1951, 280 S.
- Sister M. Adela, FDNSC: I will give them one heart! A sketch of the life of Archbishop Louis Couppé and the Congregation founded by him – The Daughters of Mary Immaculate of Vunapope, Vunapope, East New Britain, Papua New Guinea 1968, 78 pp.
- Joseph Ulbrich (ed.): Pionier auf Neuguinea. Briefe von P. Alfons Schäfer SVD, Steyler Verlagsbuchhandlung, Kaldenkirchen, Rhld. 1960, 147 + 3 Karten (gez. von P. H. Emmerich).
- Mary R. Mennis - B. Franke: They Came to Matupit. The Story of St. Michaels Church on Matupit Island, Catholic Press: Kokopo, PNG 1972, 120 pp.
- N. Gash – J. Whittaker: Pictorial History of New Guinea, Jacaranda Press: Milton, Queensland 1975, ISBN 186273-025-3.
- Hugh Laracy: Marists and Melanesians. A History of Catholic Missions in the Solomon Islands, Australian National University Press: Canberra 1976, ISBN 0-7081-0404-5
- Sister Mary Venard FDNSC: The History of the Daughters of our Lady of the Sacred Heart in Papua New Guinea. Our Lady of the Sacred Heart House, Gordon, Port Moresby, Papua New Guinea 1978, 176 pp.
- Mary Rosa MacGinley, Presentation Sisters: Papua New Guinea, 1966–2006. Triple D Books, Wagga Wagga 2008, 251 pp.
- Mary R. Mennis: Hagen Saga. The story of Father William Ross, First American Missionary to Papua New Guinea, Institute of PNG Studies, Boroko, Port Moresby 1982, 209 pp.
- Reiner Jaspers, MSC: A Brief History of the Catholic Church in Papua New Guinea, in: Papers Prepared for the Visit of Pope John Paul II to Papua New Guinea 7–10 May 1984, Port Moresby 1984, 1–6.
- R. Jaspers: The Beginnings of the Catholic Church in Papua New Guinea, in: Papers.. 1984, 31–46.
- George Delbos: The Mustard Seed. From a French Mission to a Papuan Church, 1885–1985, Institute of Papua New Guinea Studies, Port Moresby 1985. ISBN 978-9980680020
- Rufus Pech: The Acts of the Apostles in Papua New Guinea and Solomon Islands, in: B. Schwarz (ed), An Introduction to Ministry in Melanesia, Point Series No. 7, The Melanesian Institute: Goroka, PNG 1985, 17–71.
- John Nilles: They went out to sow. The Beginning of the work of the Catholic Mission in the highlands of PNG. 1933–1943, (Analecta SVD 62), Roma 1987.
- Mary Taylor Huber: The Bishops' Progress. A Historical Ethnography of Catholic Missionary Experience on the Sepik Frontier, Washington - London : Smithsonian Institution Press 1988, 264 pp., ISBN 0-87474-544-6.
- Mary Taylor Huber: The Bishops' Progress: Representations of Missionary Experience on the Sepik Frontier, in: Nancy Lutkehaus (ed.): Sepik Heritage: Tradition and Change in Papua New Guinea, Crawford House Press: Bathurst, NSW (Australia)1990, ISBN 1-86333-014-3: pp. 197–211.
- Alphonse Schaefer SVD: Cassowary of the Mountains. The Memoirs of a Pioneer in PNG 1930-1958, (Analecta SVD - 69), Roma 1991, 154 pp.
- Colman Renali: The Roman Catholic Church's Participation in the Ecumenical Movement in Papua New Guinea. A Historical, Contextual, and Pastoral Perspective, Dissertatione apud Pont. Universitatem S. Thomae, die 18, mense II, anno 1991, Rome 1991, 227 pp.
- John Garrett: Footsteps in the Sea. Christianity in Oceania to World War II, Institute of pacific Studies - University of the South Pacific in association with World Council of Churches: Suva and Geneva, 1992, 514 S., ISBN 982-02-0068-7
- Theo Aerts MSC: The Birth of a Religious Movement: A Comparison of Melanesian Cargo Cults and Early Christianity, in Verbum SVD 20, 1979, 323–344; reprinted in: Sedos Bulletin 38 (2006) 239–241; 284-295.
- Theo Aerts, (ed), The martyrs of Papua New Guinea: 333 missionary lives lost during World War II, University of Papua New Guinea Press, Port Moresby, 1994.
- Theo Aerts, Christianity in Melanesia, University Press of Papua New Guinea, Port Moresby 1998. 256 pp., ISBN 978-9980840691
- Paul Steffen: Missionsbeginn in Neuguinea. Die Anfänge der Rheinischen, Neuendettelsauer u. Steyler Missionsarbeit in Neuguinea. (Studia Instituti Missiologici S.V.D. - 61) Steyler Verlag, Nettetal 1995, ISBN 3-8050-0351-X.
- Divine Word Missionaries - Holy Spirit Sisters: Sent by the Word. 100 years of service by Divine Word Missionaries (1896–1996) and Sisters Servants of the Holy Spirit (1899–1999) on Mainland New Guinea, Production team: Geoff Brumm, Diosnel Centurion, Frank Mihalic, Francesco Sarego and Paul Steffen, Mt. Hagen - Madang 1995, 192 pp., ISBN 0-86935-093-5.
- James Waldersee: 'Neither Eagles Nor Saints'. MSC Missions in Oceania 1881–1975, Sydney: Chevalier Press 1995, ISBN 9780869401446.
- Paul B. Steffen: From Church to Mission. Assessment and Perspectives of the Catholic Church in Mainland New Guinea after Its First Hundred Years. In: Steyler Missionswissenschaftliche Institut (ed.), in: Steyler Missionswissenschaftliches Institut (ed.):Divine Word Missionaries in Papua New Guinea, 1896–1996, Festschrift. Steyler Verl., Nettetal 1996, 231-258, ISBN 3-8050-0380-3. - ibidem in: Verbum SVD 37:1-2 (1996) 231–258.
- Frank Mihalic: Readings in PNG Mission History. A chronicle of SVD and SSpS mission involvement on mainland New Guinea between 1946 and 1996, Divine Word University Press, Madang, PNG 1999, 304 S., ISBN 0-86935-063-3.
- Paul B. Steffen, Die katholischen Missionen in Deutsch-Neuguinea, in: H.J. Hiery (ed.), Die deutsche Südsee. Ein Handbuch, 2nd improved and enlarged edition, Schöningh: Paderborn, 2002, 343–383. ISBN 3-506-73912-3
- Sr. Mary Drum MSC: Centenary of 'Martyrdom' at St. Paul's. Remembering the Historical Event and Reflecting Afresh. Archdiocese of Rabaul Office in collaboration with the Centenary Committee, Rabaul, East New Britain, Papua New Guinea 2004, 166 pp.
- Ian Breward: A History of the Churches in Australasia, (The Oxford History of Christian Churches), Oxford University Press, Oxford 2001, Reprinted 2008, 474 pp., ISBN 978-0-19-927592-2.
- Ralph M. Wiltgen: The Founding of the Roman Catholic Church in Melanesia and Micronesia 1850–1874, Princeton Theological Monograph Series 84, Pickwick Publications, Eugene, Oregon 2008.
- Alois Greiler SM (ed.): Catholic Beginnings in Oceania. Marist Missionary Perspectives, ATF Press: Hindmarsh, SA, Australia 2009, VII + 240 p. + 14 photo-pages, ISBN 978-1-921511-54-7.
- Ennio Mantovani, SVD : Mission: Collision or Dialogical Encounter? A Chronicle of St. Paul’s Parish, Yobai, Papua New Guinea. Studia Instituti Missiologici SVD 95, Steyler Verlag: Nettetal 2011, 475 p., ISBN 978-3-8050-0581-4.
- Katharina Stornig: Sisters Crossing Boundaries. German Missionary Nuns in Colonial Togo and New Guinea, 1897–1960. (Veröffentlichungen des Instituts für Europäische Geschichte Mainz 232). Göttingen, Vandenhoeck & Ruprecht, 2013. ISBN 3525101295
- Diane Langmore, European missionaries in Papua, 1874–1914: a group portrait, PhD Thesis, ANU, 1981.
- Paul B. Steffen, From a Receiving to a Sending Church. 125 Years of the Catholic Church in Mainland New Guinea, 1896–2021. Verbum SVD 64.1 (2023), 88–111.
- Paul B. Steffen,The Medical and Health Care Commitment of the Catholic Mission in Mainland New Guinea, 1896–1945, Verbum SVD 61:4 (2020) 417–431.
- Paul B. Steffen, Sios bilong yumi long Niugini. Catholic Mission History in mainland New Guinea, 1896–1945, Society of the Divine Word, Papua New Guinea Province, Madang 2022, 234 photos and 4 maps, 440 pp., ISBN 978-9980-919-02-1.
- Geovanne Bustos SVD – Patrick Gesch SVD (eds.), The Word and the Words. 125 Years of SVD Engagement in Papua New Guinea, (Studia Instituti Missiologici SVD – 120), Franz Schmitt Verlag, Siegburg 2022
- Mary R. Mennis, Lotu Katolik. Catholic Missions in Papua New Guinea and Oceania, 1880s to 2024, Vol. I & Vol. II, Liturgical Catechetical Institute, Goroka 2024, IX-X.
