= Caritas Oceania =

Oceanian confederation of Catholic relief organisations

- Purpose: Humanitarian aid, international development
- Region served: Oceania
- Official language: English
- President: Cardinal Soane Patita Paini Mafi (president)
- Affiliations: Caritas Internationalis

Caritas Oceania is an Oceanian confederation of Catholic social, humanitarian, and relief organisations. It is one of the seven regional confederations of Caritas Internationalis members. Caritas Oceania consists of seven member organisations from across the Pacific Islands, Australia and New Zealand.

== History ==
=== 2000s ===
In 2005, Caritas Oceania proposed that climate change should become the chief environmental justice focus of Caritas Internationalis.

In 2006, Caritas Oceania held a meeting in Wellington to discuss climate change, where they were addressed by New Zealand Minister of Energy and Climate Change Issues David Parker.

=== 2010s ===
Beginning in 2014, Caritas Oceania published annual 'Caritas State of the Environment for Oceania' reports focussing on environmental issues throughout the Pacific, including climate change and its affects on Pacific communities.

=== 2020s ===
In February 2021, Caritas Oceania president Sr Senolita Vakata died, and was replaced in March by Cardinal Soane Patita Paini Mafi of Tonga. The same year, Caritas Internationalis celebrated its 70th anniversary with a series of webinars focussing on different regions, including one for Caritas Oceania in which members spoke of the issues facing the region regarding environmental justice and gender equality.

In 2022, Caritas Oceania published a report entitled 'Twin Clouds on the Horizon' focussing on climate finance issues in the Pacific, and the interrelated threats of climate damage and debt faced by Pacific Island nations. The report was co-authored with Jubilee Australia Research Centre. In July 2022, Caritas Oceania sent a delegate to the United Nations Ocean Conference in Lisbon, Portugal.

In 2024 Caritas Oceania authored a research report entitled Weathering the Storm: Addressing Debt and Climate Vulnerability in the Pacific. The report was released at the 2024 United Nations Climate Change Conference (COP29), with Tuvaluan Minister for Climate Change Maina Talia present. The report exposed serious issues with climate finance for Pacific countries, highlighting that climate finance is often given as loans rather than grants, leading to unsustainable levels of sovereign debt. The report also found a US$1bn shortfall in climate finance for Pacific island countries from what is required to adapt to climate change. Caritas Oceania made three key recommendations in the report: that climate finance to the Pacific should be significantly increased; that it should occur through UN-administered grants rather than loans; and that global financial systems should be improved to restructure or cancel unsustainable and illegitimate sovereign debts tied to climate finance.

== Members ==
Country	Member organisation (English name)	Established
Australia	Caritas Australia	1964
Fiji	Caritas Fiji	2019
Papua New Guinea	Caritas Papua New Guinea	1974
New Zealand	Caritas Aotearoa New Zealand	1966
Samoa	Caritas Samoa	2008
Tonga	Caritas Tonga	1972
Pacific Islands	Caritas Pacific Islands	1980
