= Carlo Salerio =

Italian Venerable

Venerable Carlo Salerio MEP
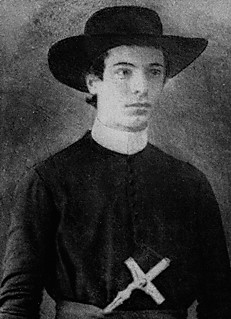
- Born: 22 March 1827; Milan
- Died: 29 September 1870 (aged 43); Milan

Carlo Salerio (22 March 1827 – 29 September 1870), was a missionary of the MEP on the island of Woodlark (modern day Papua New Guinea).

== Life ==
Salerio studied in Seveso, Milan, and Monza. He would later meet Angelo Ramazzotti, who introduced him to the =Pontifical Institute for Foreign Missions.

During the unification of Italy, Salerio fought in the insurgency of the Five Days of Milan. On May 25, 1850, he was ordained to priesthood, later with an agreement with the, Archbishop of Milan, Cardinal Bartolomeo Carlo Romilli he entered the Paris Foreign Missions Society.

In 1852 Salerio left to the island of Woodlark leaving in 1855 due to illness. He was part of one of the first groups of missionaries to Micronesia. When he returned to Milan he taught English and remained a charitable of the church. He would dream of a female religious foundation which he would achieve in 1859.

In 1859, both he and Carolina Orsenigo founded the Institute of the Sisters of Reparation, which would help women in need.

Salerio suffered from multiple illnesses in Oceania, forcing him to be sent to Sydney, and later back to Italy. He died of natural causes in 1870.

== Beatification process ==
On May 13, 2019, Pope Francis declared Salerio as venerable.
