= Catholic Bishops Conference of Papua New Guinea and Solomon Islands =

Assembly of Catholic bishops

- Abbreviation: CBCPNGSI
- Formation: 1966; 60 years ago
- Type: Episcopal conference, association
- Registration no.: 5-35
- Purpose: To support the ministry of bishops
- Headquarters: Port Moresby, Papua New Guinea
- Coordinates: 9.4383°S 147.1901°E
- Region served: Papua New Guinea, Solomon Islands
- President: Bishop Otto Separy
- Main organ: Conference
- Affiliations: Catholic Church
- Website: www.pngsicbc.com

The Catholic Bishops Conference of Papua New Guinea and Solomon Islands (short: CBCPNGSI) is the national episcopal conference of the bishops of the Catholic Church in Papua New Guinea and in the Solomon Islands.

It brings together 22 bishops and archbishops who represent all the Catholic dioceses in Papua New Guinea and Solomon Islands. The Bishops Conference's work is coordinated by a general secretariat located in Port Moresby. Since January 2025, the Secretary-General is Father Lawrence Arockiaraj. Bishop Otto Separy is the current President of the CBCPNGSI.

The work is structured around several committees, which in turn coordinate the activities of various commissions. Each commission focuses on a specific area, such as priestly formation, social communications, evangelisation, or ecumenical and interfaith dialogue. Caritas Papua New Guinea operates under the responsibility of the Bishops Conference and serves as its social and development arm.
