= Peter To Rot =

First Papua New Guinean saint and Martyr (1912–1945)

Saint Peter To Rot

Martyr
- Born: 5 March 1912; New Pomerania, German New Guinea
- Died: 7 July 1945 (aged 33); Rakunai, East New Britain, Territory of New Guinea
- Venerated in: Roman Catholic Church
- Beatified: 17 January 1995, Sir John Guise Stadium, Port Moresby, Papua New Guinea by Pope John Paul II
- Canonized: 19 October 2025, Saint Peter's Square, Vatican City by Pope Leo XIV
- Feast: 7 July
- Attributes: Martyr's palm, crucifix worn as a necklace, sometimes holding a globus cruciger
- Patronage: Married couples; Catechists; Rakunai; World Youth Day 2008

Peter To Rot (/toʊ roʊt/; 5 March 1912 – 7 July 1945) was a Papua New Guinean Catholic who was canonized for his continued practice of Catholicism in the face of Japanese repression during World War II. He served as a catechist in his village and was entrusted with the leadership of the local parish during World War II when Imperial Japanese forces occupied the region and imprisoned Catholic missionaries. In response to Japanese oppression of his community, he publicly opposed their actions and continued to hold secret prayer services after the Japanese restricted him from active pastoral service. To Rot married in 1936, and he criticized Japanese attempts to encourage his people to return to the pre-Christian practice of taking multiple wives. He was executed by the Japanese in 1945.

His beatification was celebrated in Papua New Guinea in 1995. His canonization took place on 19 October 2025.

== Life ==
=== Education and marriage ===
Peter To Rot was born on 5 March 1912 on the New Pomerania island in the then-German New Guinea. He was the third of six children born to Angelo Tu Puia (the well-respected village chief) and Maria Ia Tumul. Both of his parents converted to Catholicism in 1898.

His father taught him the basics of the Catholic catechism and sent him to the local mission school in 1919, even though primary education was not obligatory at the time. Peter was quite agile in climbing coconut trees, and he was happy to do this to obtain coconuts for older villagers. It was rare for him to be mischievous at school, but he was honest and quick to help those in need. In 1930, the parish priest of Rakunai - Father Laufer - asked his father if he would allow To Rot to study for the priesthood. His father said that the time was not yet right but that it would be more than appropriate if his son would study to become a catechist. Soon afterward, Peter began his studies at Saint Paul's College of the Missionaries of the Sacred Heart in Taliligap. After completing his studies in 1933, he was commissioned as a catechist to serve at the parish of Rakunai, and the local bishop gave him an official catechist's cross. To Rot then returned to his village and assisted Father Laufer. He was an excellent teacher, he knew how to organize his classes, and people noticed that he always carried a Bible on his person.

On 11 November 1936, he married Paula Ia Varpit, and the couple had three children. Unfortunately, one died as an infant, and another child died soon after the end of World War II. Their third child was born after To Rot's death and survived into old age. Peter and Paula were married in a Catholic church, although they also observed some of the local traditional customs at the wedding.

=== Catechist ===
In March 1942, Japanese forces occupied the nation, forcing out an Australian garrison. Japanese soldiers interned all foreign missionaries but did not initially prohibit religious practice. When the parish priest was forced to leave the village, he asked To Rot to take charge of his parish. In this role, To Rot cared for those who were ill and poor while continuing to educate Christian converts. Towards the end of 1943, local Japanese authorities restricted religious services, and a few months later, they completely forbade them. But To Rot continued to hold prayer services in secret, despite the dangers to his own life and the fears of others. When their local church was destroyed, he built a "bush church” outside the village. In this hidden church, he continued to pray with others and maintained records of baptisms and weddings.

Metepa was a married man, a Christian, and a policeman who worked for the Japanese in the same village. He was attracted to a married Protestant woman named Ia Mentil. When To Rot and Mentil's father realized that Metepa intended to kidnap Mentil and take her as his second wife, they prevented him from doing so. The furious officer reported this to his superior, Kueka, who summoned To Rot.

The Japanese authorities had legalized the practice of polygamy on the island in an attempt to encourage the people to return to their previous (pagan) traditions. To Rot had publicly opposed this practice as contrary to the Christian faith. When To Rot appeared before Kueka, Kueka ordered him to cease his pastoral activities. At the same time, Metepa, aided by a friend, seized Mentil and assaulted her husband. However, To Rot and the village chief managed to locate Mentil and return her to her husband. To Rot's public defense of monogamous marriage in this incident led the Japanese to pay spies to monitor his activities and try to catch him practicing his faith. A couple from the village eventually reported To Rot to the authorities, and the police arrested him after finding religious objects in a search of his home. When he was arrested on Christmas 1944, he was planting vegetables which he had planned to give to the Japanese as an act of charity.

After his arrest, To Rot was taken to the police headquarters. The chief of police, Meshida, asked To Rot if he had been preaching, and To Rot said yes. Meshida then attacked him on the face and the back of the neck, and he ordered To Rot to be imprisoned. Two Christian leaders attempted to get him released but were unsuccessful. To Rot confided to his mother that he knew he would die, but he assured her that he was more than prepared to die for Jesus Christ if that was the case.

To Rot was initially locked in a small and windowless cell. He was then sentenced to two months' imprisonment in the Vunaiara concentration camp. On one occasion, his wife and two children came to visit him. His wife begged him to stop being a catechist so that he would be safe. But To Rot was adamant that he would not relinquish his responsibilities to his people. On the day of his death, he told his mother: "The police told me that, this evening, a Japanese doctor will come to give me some medicine. This is surprising since I'm not sick. I suspect this is a trick". He told his wife to bring him his cross and his best clothes so that he could face God dressed in proper attire.

=== Death ===
While in prison in 1945, To Rot was given a lethal injection and then given something to drink. When the guards saw that the poison was acting too slowly, they made him lie down, while the doctor covered his mouth. He began to have convulsions, and the guards held him down and struck him on the back of his neck with a beam. After his death, a Japanese policeman went to To Rot's village of Rakunai and told the people: "Your catechist is dead." When the incredulous chief of the village challenged him and demanded to know what the officers had done to To Rot, the officer said: "He fell ill and died." To Rot's uncle, Taura, went to the prison with Commander Meshida to view To Rot's remains and to remove them for burial. He discovered that To Rot's body was still warm. He was curled up with cotton stuffed in his ears and nose, and with blood and a red scarf wrapped around his neck. The back of his neck was swollen and showed visible wounds, and a clear needle mark was present on his right arm. To Rot's remains were soon buried in Rakunai, and he was given a chief's funeral in the Catholic cemetery. However, the funeral was held in silence out of fear of the Japanese soldiers.

== Commemoration ==
In 2012, Pope Benedict XVI encouraged all married couples to look to To Rot's "example of courage," and he later dispatched Cardinal Joseph Zen Ze-kium to participate in the celebrations at Rabaul to mark the centennial of the late catechist's birth. The pope discussed To Rot in his "ad limina" meeting with the Papuan bishops on 9 June 2012, and Archbishop of Rabaul Francesco Panfilo issued a pastoral letter around that time which addressed the life and example of To Rot.

On 5 March 2012, the Papuan government issued a series of postage stamps in honor of the centennial of To Rot's birth.

== Beatification ==
The beatification process began on 14 January 1986 after the Congregation for the Causes of Saints issued the official "nihil obstat" to the cause and gave him the title of Servant of God; the formal diocesan phase collecting documentation occurred in the Rabaul archdiocese from 21 January 1987 until 30 March 1989, when all documents were sealed in boxes and sent to Rome for the Congregation of the Causes of Saints (C.C.S.) to review. The C.C.S. validated this inquest on 2 June 1989 and received the Positio dossier from the postulation of the cause in 1991. Theologians approved the dossier's contents on 26 June 1992, as did the C.C.S. members on 1 December 1992. His beatification received approval from Pope John Paul II on 2 April 1993, after the pope confirmed that To Rot had been killed "in odium fidei" (in hatred of the faith). John Paul II beatified To Rot on 17 January 1995 while on his visit to Papua New Guinea.

== Canonization ==
On 31 March 2025, Pope Francis promulgated a decree of the Dicastery for the Causes of Saints announcing the canonization of Peter To Rot. He was canonized by Pope Leo XIV on 19 October 2025.

=== Feast ===
To Rot's liturgical feast is affixed to the date of his death, as is the norm. He is included in the Roman Rite liturgical calendar in his native Papua New Guinea, as well as in the Solomon Islands; in Australia; and for the Missionaries of the Sacred Heart.
