= Paschal Sweeney =

Paschal Sweeney CP
- Bishop of Vanimo
- Church: Catholic Church
- Diocese: Diocese of Vanimo
- In office: 20 September 1963 – 22 September 1979
- Predecessor: (Prefecture erected)
- Successor: John Etheridge

Orders
- Ordination: 11 July 1935
- Consecration: 25 January 1967 by Norman Gilroy

Personal details
- Born: 13 December 1912 Woodville, Adelaide, South Australia, Australia
- Died: 1 September 1981 (aged 68)

Paschal Sweeney (13 December 1912 – 1 September 1980) was an Australian clergyman and bishop for the Roman Catholic Diocese of Vanimo. He was elected Provincial of the Passionist Fathers in 1952, and subsequently moved to Papua New Guinea to take up mission work. He was appointed bishop in 1966. He died in 1981.
