= Francis Meli (bishop) =

His Excellency Francis Meli
- Bishop of Vanimo
- Church: Roman Catholic Church
- Diocese: Roman Catholic Diocese of Vanimo
- Installed: 5 February 2018
- Previous posts: Judicial Vicar, Archdiocese of Rabaul

Orders
- Rank: Bishop

Personal details
- Born: 21 July 1962 (age 64) Poi Island, West New Britain, Papua New Guinea
- Denomination: Roman Catholic
- Residence: Bishop's House, Vanimo, Papua New Guinea
- Motto: JUSTITIA ET VERITAS
- Coat of arms

Francis Meli JCL (born 21 July 1962) in Poi Island, West New Britain, Papua New Guinea to his parents Anthon Wale and Anna Aisiga. His early education started in 1972 on Poi Island at St. Leo Primary School Sasavoru. In 1978, Francis Meli attended Kimbe Provincial High School and in 1981 he went on to the St. Peter Channel College, East New Britain. From 1985 to 1990 he attended the Holy Spirit Seminary at Bomana. Education has brought Francis Meli to various parts of the world including Saint Paul University in Canada. On November 24, 1991, Francis Meli entered priesthood and has served mostly in East New Britain Province.

== Bishop ==
Pope Francis has accepted the resignation of bishop Cesare Bonivento of the Diocese of Vanimo for having reached the age limit. As the new diocesan bishop was appointed Father Francis Meli.
