= New Zealand Catholic Bishops' Conference =

Assembly of Catholic bishops

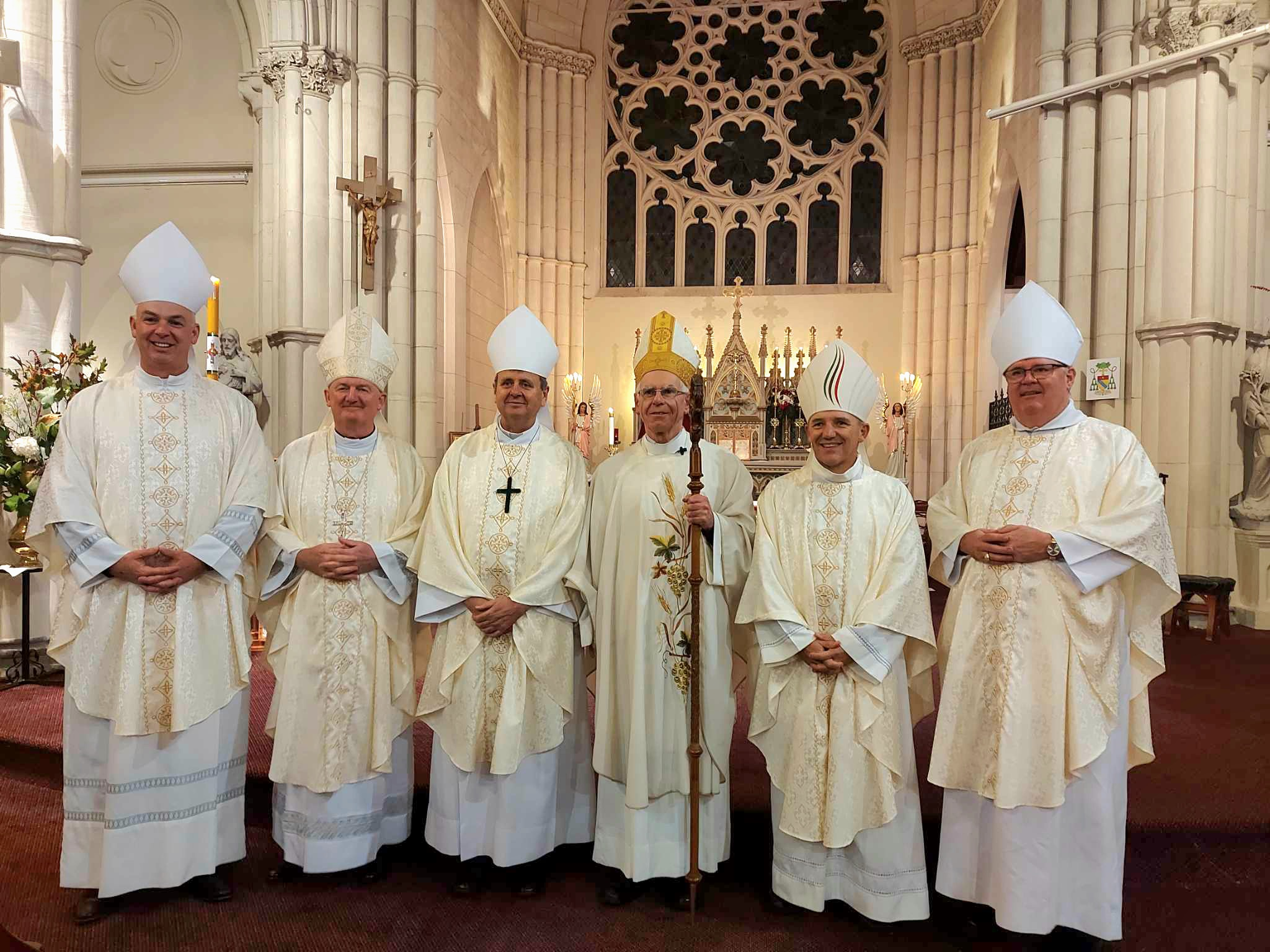
The current New Zealand Catholic bishops (pictured May 2024)

The New Zealand Catholic Bishops' Conference (NZCBC; Māori: Te Huinga o ngā Pīhopa Katorika o Aotearoa) is an episcopal conference of the Catholic Church in New Zealand that gathers the bishops of the country in order to discuss pastoral issues and in general all matters that have to do with the Church. The NZCBC was formed after the Second Vatican Council in the 1960s.

The Conference has a Secretariat located in Wellington, and a number of agencies and offices to assist the bishops in carrying out national level functions. The NZCBC established a Committee for Interfaith Relations to assist them in their interfaith work.

Recent political engagement by New Zealand bishops have included statements issued in relation to: indigenous rights and Treaty of Waitangi settlements; the rights of refugees and migrants; promoting restorative justice over retributive justice in New Zealand; and opposition to the change of abortion and euthanasia law changes.

Caritas Aotearoa New Zealand is the official international aid organisation of the Bishops' Conference.

== Members ==
- Bishop Stephen Lowe - Diocese of Auckland (since 17 December 2021)
- Bishop Richard Laurenson - Diocese of Hamiton (since 25 October 2023)
- Bishop John Adams - Diocese of Palmerston North (since 22 June 2023)
- Metropolitan Archbishop Paul Martin SM - Archdiocese of Wellington (since 4 May 2023)
- Bishop Michael Gielen - Diocese of Christchurch (since 21 May 2022)
- Bishop Michael Dooley - Diocese of Dunedin (since 22 February 2018)

== See also ==
- List of New Zealand Catholic bishops
