= Diocese of Wabag =

Latin Catholic diocese in Papua New Guinea

Coordinates: 5.4806°S 143.6648°E

Diocese of Wabag Dioecesis Uabagana

Location
- Country: Papua New Guinea
- Ecclesiastical region: Archdiocese of Mount Hagen
- Headquarters: Wabag

Statistics
- Area: 11,704 km^{2} (4,519 sq mi)
- Population: Total; Catholics: (as of 2023); 454,805; 79,650 (17.5%)
- Parishes: 18

Information
- Denomination: Catholic Church
- Sui iuris church: Latin Church
- Rite: Roman Rite
- Established: 18 March 1982; 44 years ago

Current leadership
- Pope: Leo XIV
- Bishop: Justin Ain Soongie
- Metropolitan Archbishop: Clement Papa

The Diocese of Wabag is a Latin Catholic suffragan diocese of the Archdiocese of Mount Hagen. It was erected in 1982.

== Bishops ==
=== Ordinaries ===
- Hermann Raich, S.V.D. (1982–2008)
- Arnold Orowae (2008–2024)
- Justin Ain Soongie (2025–present)

=== Coadjutor bishop ===
- Arnold Orowae (2004–2008)

=== Auxiliary bishop ===
- Arnold Orowae (1999–2004), appointed Coadjutor here
- Justin Ain Soongie (2021–2025), appointed Bishop here

== See also ==
- Catholic Church in Papua New Guinea
- List of Catholic dioceses in Papua New Guinea and Solomon Islands
