= Wolfgang Auderer =

Austrian freestyle skier (born 1981)

Wolfgang Auderer (born 26 May 1981) is a retired Austrian freestyle skier who specialized in the skicross discipline. He was born in Jerzens, Austria, and represented the sports club WSV Jerzens while he was active.

He made his World Cup debut in November 2002 in Tignes, with a 25th place. He finished among the top twenty for the first time one year later, with a twelfth place in November 2003 in Saas-Fee. The rest of the 2003–04 season was mediocre, but he then opened the 2004–05 season with an eighth place in Saas-Fee in October. He followed up with a twelfth place in Les Contamines, but then dropped into the mid-range, rounding off the season with a seventeenth place at the 2005 World Championships. Since then he has finished occasionally among the top twenty, having equalled his World Cup best of twelfth once, in March 2008 in Grindelwald. He finished 21st at the 2007 World Championships in Madonna di Campiglio.

His last race was a World Cup race at Lake Placid, New York, in 2010. He finished in 43rd place.
