= Alfredo Cremonesi =

Italian Roman Catholic priest

Blessed Alfredo Cremonesi PIME

Martyr
- Born: 15 May 1902; Ripalta Guerina, Cremona, Kingdom of Italy
- Died: 7 February 1953 (aged 50); Donokù, Taungngu, Bago, Myanmar
- Venerated in: Roman Catholic Church
- Beatified: 19 October 2019, Crema, Italy by Cardinal Giovanni Angelo Becciu
- Feast: 7 February

Alfredo Cremonesi (15 May 1902 – 7 February 1953) was an Italian Roman Catholic priest of the Pontifical Institute for Foreign Missions. He studied in Crema and Milan before setting off from Genoa to Naples and then to the Burmese missions via boat. He pledged that he would never return to the Italian mainland and spent the remainder of his life working with the Burmese people in mountain villages despite the great difficulties he faced. Cremonesi was also a prisoner of the Japanese during World War II after the Japanese occupied the nation.

The Burmese independence reached in 1948 prompted guerrilla conflict which caused great unrest and destruction to the point that Cremonesi and other missionaries were forced into exile so as to remain safe. But he reached out to the guerillas and received their permission to return to the village he worked in. It was also there in that village that government forces mistook him for a rebel - or a supporter of the rebels - and shot him dead alongside the village chief and two girls.

The beatification process for the late priest opened in 2004 and he became titled as a Servant of God. Pope Francis approved his beatification and it took place in Crema on 19 October 2019.

== Life ==
=== Childhood and education ===
Alfredo Cremonesi was born on 15 May 1902 in Ripalta Guerina in Cremona as the first of seven children to the grocer Enrico Cremonesi and Maria Rosa Scartabellati. He received his baptism on 16 May in the local parish church from Angelo Bassi. One cousin was Amina Uselli and a paternal aunt was the nun Sister Gemma (16 July 1878−3 April 1958). Cremonesi received his Confirmation on 4 October 1908 from the Bishop of Crema Ernesto Fontana and then made his First Communion on 1 April 1909. His father was a devoted Christian who opposed Fascism and it was his mother who oversaw the religious education of the seven children. It was in his childhood at some stage that he read the journal of Thérèse of Lisieux and from that point fostered a deep devotion to her. His brother Ernesto was also a devoted Christian whom the Nazis arrested and jailed in a concentration camp where he would die in 1945 before the European Theatre conflict ended. Cremonesi sent a letter to his parents upon learning this and said that "I am proud to be his brother" and that "Ernesto will be able to do more in paradise than he could have done on earth".

His time in school was interrupted due to a severe disease and he was forced to spend most of that time confined to his bed. His frail health since childhood led to people concluding that he would never be able to enter the missions since it would be improbable that he would be cured of his persistent ailments. The desire to enter the missions had been a dream he had for sometime since his late childhood and into his adolescence. But he defied the odds (and the expectation of doctors who thought he would die in a few months) and overcame his disease with Cremonesi attributing his healing to Thérèse of Lisieux. Upon his recuperation he transferred to Milan for education in an institute that the Pontifical Institute for Foreign Missions managed to prepare new missionaries on 17 September 1922. He became known for being both impetuous and a gifted writer who published a collection of poems.

=== Ordination and departure ===
Between October and November 1923 he received the minor orders before being elevated into the subdiaconate on 19 April 1924 and the diaconate on 29 June 1924. The seminarian received his ordination to the priesthood in October 1924 (from the P.I.M.E. bishop Giovanni Menicatti in the San Francesco Saverio church) and then in June 1925 learned that his dream to enter the missions was to take place for he would be sent to the then-Burma. Cremonesi received a special dispensation for his ordination since he had not reached the canonical age required for ordination. Cremonesi celebrated his first Mass on 19 October 1924 in San Michele and on 5 October 1925 received the cross of the missions from the Archbishop of Milan Eugenio Tosi. But before being sent to the missions he was put in charge of teaching the Italian language in the Seminario Minore di San Ilario in Nervi in Genoa. He left Genoa for Naples and set sail from there on 16 October 1925 but before leaving declared he would never return to his homeland despite the insistence of his relatives to return for a visit. His mother did not take well to his desire for the missions but relented to her son's wishes and maintained correspondence with him on a frequent basis. Cremonesi celebrated his last Mass before leaving in Crema in the Santuario della Madonna delle Grazie on 4 October 1925.

=== Apostolate ===
But his new mission also proved difficult for the enthusiastic Cremonesi who suffered from loneliness for a brief time upon his arrival on 10 November 1925. He worked with the Karen people in an isolated mountain village and often had to travel miles between communities to visit the people. His first assignment was in Yedashé in western Yoma to visit villages and he was successful in the conversion of some of the natives. He was later transferred to Donokù and would remain there until the outbreak of World War II in relative peace. Cremonesi was often exhausted from his extensive trips and he even once contracted malaria. During the 1920s he maintained correspondence with the P.I.M.E. superior Paolo Manna and met with Manna when he visited the Burmese missions on 19 February 1928.

The outbreak of World War II saw the British-run Burma enter the conflict to the detriment of Italian missionaries who soon found themselves as enemies due to Benito Mussolini declaring his alliance with the Axis powers. To that end he was moved further north to Moshò to work in the villages. Near the end of the war he was forced to live in the forest where he ate herbs in order to survive. Cremonesi wrote of the trials he endured during the war in a letter dated on 20 February 1946; he refers to his lack of food and clothing (limited to what he had on) and noting that villages were devoid of people with marketplaces being abandoned.

In 1941 he avoided Japanese imprisonment in a concentration camp in India after the Japanese occupied the nation. He lived eating herbs cooked in salt and water during this time but was discovered and caught. In the final month of the war a Japanese officer took him and tied him up for the night before allowing him to leave in the morning where he took refuge in the woods. Cremonesi did not understand the reason for his release but attributed it to the intercession of God.

Cremonesi fostered a great devotion to Thérèse of Lisieux and to the Sacred Heart. He practiced Eucharistic Adoration each night for one hour before the tabernacle and awoke around 4:00am to celebrate Mass.

He returned to Donokù after the war had ended to resume his work. But Burmese independence from the British Empire in 1948 prompted conflict once the Karen people rebelled and started to resort to use guerilla tactics against the new government. This conflict would endure even after Cremonesi's later murder. In August 1950 the rebels attacked the village prompting both Cremonesi and the inhabitants to flee into the forest before he took refuge close o the mission in Taungngu. Cremonesi was saddened that these occurrences had taken place and he referred to his current state as an exile. On 25 March 1952 he was permitted to return to the village where he was able to resume his work after he made contact with the guerillas who allowed him to return to the village. Cremonesi knew of Clemente Vismara and wrote of him in high esteem.

=== Murder ===
The rebels defeated government soldiers - on 7 February 1953 - which prompted the surviving government forces to flee to the village that Cremonesi was stationed in. But the soldiers soon became convinced upon their entrance that the villagers favored the rebels and were perhaps allies to the rebels. This presented a clear danger to the villagers which prompted Cremonesi to intervene to assure them that there were no rebels nor rebel allies present in the village. This convinced the soldiers who left the village in peace. But the rebels ambushed the soldiers just outside the village which prompted the soldiers to return in anger to seek out Cremonesi believing it had been a set up. The soldiers even perceived his clothing to be alike to that of the rebels. Cremonesi's words went ignored and the soldiers fired their machine guns at him and the village chief who both collapsed to the ground. Two girls were also killed in that attack. The villagers fled into the forest during the commotion while the soldiers entered the local church and desecrated it before setting the village ablaze.

The villagers returned to the remains of their village on 8 February to collect and inter the dead which included Cremonesi (while also washing his remains). But the villagers - before his burial - cut some parts of his beard and bloodied shirt and sent it to P.I.M.E. authorities in Taungngu in an envelope with an inscription: "Relics of the martyr Father Cremonesi to be sent to his parents". On 7 May 1953 a P.I.M.E. priest visited Donokù for the identification of his remains which were exhumed for a solemn funeral and burial in Taungngu. His death was announced in Crema in the diocesan paper "Il nuovo Torrazzo" on 14 February 1953 in a piece entitled "Abbiamo un martire".

== Beatification ==
The diocesan process of investigation was opened in 2004 and concluded on 9 June 2004. The Congregation for the Causes of Saints approved the cause on 5 March 2019. Pope Francis approved the cause on 19 March 2019 which allowed for Cremonesi to be beatified; it was celebrated on 19 October 2019 in Crema with Cardinal Giovanni Angelo Becciu presiding over the celebration on the pope's behalf. The postulator for this cause is Francesca Consolini.
