= Peter Louis Cakü =

Burmese bishop (1953–2020)

- Bishop of Kengtung
- Church: Catholic Church
- Diocese: Diocese of Kengtung
- In office: 2 October 2001 – 20 February 2020
- Predecessor: Abraham Than
- Successor: John Saw Yaw Han
- Previous posts: Titular Bishop of Abidda (1997-2001); Auxiliary Bishop of Kengtung (1997-2001)

Orders
- Ordination: 4 April 1982
- Consecration: 8 December 1997 by Luigi Bressan

Personal details
- Born: 23 March 1952 Union of Burma
- Died: 20 February 2020 (aged 67) Kengtung, Shan State, Myanmar

Peter Louis Cakü (23 March 1953 – 20 February 2020) was a Burmese Roman Catholic bishop.

Cakü was born in Myanmar and was ordained to the priesthood in 1982. He served as titular bishop of Abidda and as auxiliary bishop of the Roman Catholic Diocese of Kengtung, Myanmar, from 1997 to 2001. He then served as bishop of the Kengtung Diocese from 2001 until his death in 2020.
