= Chabai =

Catholic mission in Papua New Guinea

Chabai is a Catholic mission run by the Sisters of Nazareth located in the northwestern coast of Bougainville. During World War II it was occupied by the Japanese armed forces. Three Australian Marist Brothers teaching there were killed by the Japanese.

The Chabai mission operates the Nazareth Centre for Rehabilitation which was set up after the Bougainville Civil War. It has Safe houses and training rooms which are often used to hosts programs that promote social change through peacebuilding activities.
