= Clement Vismara =

Italian priest and missionary

Blessed Clement Vismara
- Born: September 6, 1897; Agrate Brianza, Italy
- Died: June 15, 1988 (aged 90); Mong Ping, Burma
- Venerated in: Roman Catholic Church
- Beatified: 26 June 2011, Milan by Pope Benedict XVI

Blessed Father Clement Vismara (September 6, 1897 – June 15, 1988) was an Italian priest and missionary. He is venerated by the Roman Catholic Church. He spent 65 of his 91 years in forests of Burma assisting Akhà and Ikò tribal peoples, particularly children and widows.

== Biography ==
=== Early life ===
Clement Vismara was born in Agrate Brianza; his parents were Attilio Egidio Vismara (1865–1905), a saddler, and Stella Annunziata Porta (1872–1902), a seamstress. He was the fifth child after his brothers Egidio, Carlo, and Francesco, and his sister Maria. He prematurely lost his mother first, who died in childbirth when the sixth brother, Luigi, was born in 1902, and then lost his father in 1905. He was entrusted to the care of relatives, attended school, and then, in 1913, entered the Seminary of St. Peter Martyr (Seveso, Milan).

On September 21, 1916, during World War I, he was called up and sent to the front as a private of the 80th Infantry Regiment Brigade Rome. He fought on Mount Maio and Adamello. He was honorably discharged on November 6, 1919, with three medals for bravery and the rank of sergeant major.

=== Mong Lin mission ===
After resuming his studies in Milan at the Lombard Seminary for Foreign Missions (which in 1926 became the Pontifical Institute for Foreign Missions) Clement was ordained on May 26, 1923. Immediately after his ordination he set out from Venice (August 2) and arrived at Toungoo, Burma, in late September to study English and local dialects. He moved to Kengtung State to the Kengtung mission in March 1924 and then left to found the new Mong Lin mission on October 27, 1924.

At Mong Lin the misery was great, the food poor and totally inadequate, and tropical diseases killed many of the missionaries (6 during the decade 1926-1936, all young people) so that in 1928 the General Superior of the Pontifical Institute for Foreign Missions (PIME) Father Paolo Manna, visiting Mong Lin, threatened the bishop of Kengtung that he would abandon the mission if other young missionaries died for lack of nutritious food or because they lived in huts of mud and straw.

In 1931, Fr. Antonio Farronato (32 years), died of malaria and Vismara remained alone.

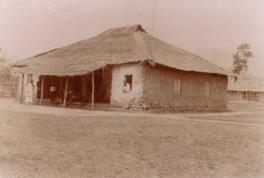
The hut used both as house and chapel by Fr. Clement between 1924 and 1929

Despite the difficulties of a primitive, dangerous and often hostile environment, Vismara continued his activities, and expanded during the 1930s when he founded other missions (Keng Lap, Mong Yong e Mong Pyak) with resident missionaries and nuns.

Vismara identified the pagan and fatalistic conception of life as the blocking element of tribal society: men often do not work and are addicted to opium, women and children are commonly abused, abandoned, sold or killed.

He concentrated his efforts on giving more rewarding jobs to indigenous people becoming first a farmer, then a breeder, a tailor, a barber, a mason, a lumberjack and so on. His objective was mainly to help orphans and widows, women who were abandoned by everyone and considered bearers of bad luck. Unlike other missionaries he tried, whenever possible, to maintain a healthy lifestyle: schedule of day, cleaning, suitable clothing, ordered eating, use of dishes. This behaviour, along with his strength, improved his stamina.

In June 1941, while the Japanese planned to occupy Burma, Vismara was interned by the British army in Kalaw with twelve other Italian missionaries because they belonged to an enemy nation. In January 1942, the Japanese army invaded Burma and in late April they freed the Italian missionaries held in Kalaw. The Mong Lin mission (where Vismara arrived at the end of August) was intact but almost occupied by the Japanese army. Vismara reopened the orphanage and undertook work as a woodcutter for the soldiers, together with his boys.

In 1945, the war ended and in 1948 Burma got its independence, followed by the beginning of separatist guerrillas which involved ethnic groups of the area (in the years 1950-1955 five brethren of PIME were murdered: Pietro Galastri, Mario Vergara, Alfredo Cremonesi, Pietro Manghisi, Eliodoro Farronato). In the first 31 years of his mission father Clement was able to turn Mong Lin into a town with about 4,000 baptized people.

=== Mong Ping mission ===
Father Vismara raised foreign aid through published letters and articles in which he explained his life in Burma.

In January 1955 Clement was sent by surprise by the bishop, Msgr. Guercilena, to Mong Ping, 225 km away, a higher and more healthy place, but where he had to start almost from scratch. He wrote to his friend Pietro Migone: «My dear, my heart wavers! after thirty-two years, when I least expect it I was transferred from Mong Lin to Mong Ping. ...I obey because I'm convinced that if I did on my own I should have got it all wrong». Throughout 1957 he was in Italy for the only holiday of his life, shared among medical care, conferences, a pilgrimage to Lourdes, visits to construction sites and, above all, a full month's retreat. But his thoughts always turned to his people and his orphans. When back in Burma, he wrote: «In Italy more than rest I worked hard». But he was happy because he carried a lot of aid, and he added: «Not to offend you but I'm much better here than in Agrate. Certainly there you eat well, drink better, sleep on soft. ...But here I can do something good every day: what could I do there, if not chatting?»
In 1961 he wrote a biography of Fr. Stephen Aikao Wong, the first local priest from Kengtung killed by some buddhists hostile to the many conversions obtained among Akha people. During the 1960s, he provided Mong Ping an orphanage (1960), school (1961), the church with the Lourdes Cave next to it (1962), houses for missionaries and sisters (1963). The school, started from scratch in 1958, counted 123 pupils in autumn 1960, 232 in October 1962, 400 in 1965 («two thirds of which pagans», he wrote).
After a military coup in 1962, the new socialist government, inspired by the Soviet model, nationalized all private activities and severely limited freedom of expression and movement. All missionaries who arrived after 1948 were expelled. Only those arriving in Burma before the World War II could remain.

=== «He never got old» ===
Despite the difficulties with the new regime, which prevented the arrival of new missionaries, and despite various ailments (prostate problems, an accident to a foot, and dentures) his work continued. In 1979, aged 82, he went to Taunggyi by jeep to meet the superior of the PIME and, after returning to Mong Ping, after 14 hours of travel, he could write: I arrived home at 7:20 pm blanched, dusted, floured like a fish before putting in a pan. A unison chorus of over 200 orphans, boys and girls, greeted me. Here is my kingdom, here I am the sovereign and live happy. In 1980 he blessed the new district Tongtà he founded among the ethnic Iko.

In subsequent years he had to adapt, with embarrassment, to being carried on a stretcher, but continued to visit the villages. The last missionary district (parish) opened by Fr. Clement, in 1986, is in Pannulong, with three nuns resident and 42 Christian villages in the Akha tribe.

On June 15, 1988, at 8:15 p.m. Clement died, serene and happy, in Mong Ping, aged 90.

This is the testimony given on him by Fr. Angelo Campagnoli at the Diocesan Process:

... His famous phrase - «You get old when you are no longer useful to anyone» – comes from the fact that he has been useful to everyone until 91 years and he felt fulfilled. He took care of the new situations that happened: they were always poor children, widows, lepers, ... everyone excited him again as if for the first time. He himself said: «When I see abandoned children, sick, lepers, opium addicts, disabled, I cannot resist, I must help». That was his lifestyle and even aging he remained true to himself, he never got old...

— “Positio”, p. 336

Father Clement was buried, as he requested, at Mong Ping in the square of the church he built in 1962, in front of Lourdes Cave.

Many Buddhists and Muslims attended the funeral. His tomb is a pilgrimage site for people of all religions.

== Process of canonization ==
In Agrate, his hometown, immediately the parish missionary group began to work for his beatification. In 1989 a statue was unveiled. On February 10, 1994, Abraham Than, Bishop of the Kengtung, appointed Father Piero Gheddo postulator for his cause. Father Gheddo appointed Francesca Consolini as an external consultant. The management of the Diocesan stage of the beatification process, from 1996 to 1998, was held by the Roman Catholic Archdiocese of Milan, Italy, because of difficulties in Myanmar. Monsignor Ennio Apeciti, President of the process, traveled to Burma, Thailand and Brasil, as well as in Italy, to interview those who knew Father Clement. In 1999 began the “Roman process” of the Congregation for Sainthood Causes which receives testimonies about miracles obtained through the Clement's intercession. On March 15, 2008, Pope Benedict XVI signed the ”Decree of Venerability” for Vismara, deeming him a Christian who had practiced virtues of the Gospel in a heroic grade. On Saturday, April 2, 2011, Pope Benedict XVI received in audience Angelo Cardinal Amato, Prefect of the Congregation for the Causes of Saints, and approved, among many other advancements of beatification causes, the official recognition of a miracle attributed to Father Clement's intercession. This is the necessary element required for him to be approved for beatification. Father Vismara's beatification took place on June 26, 2011, in the Piazza Duomo of Milan.

== Writings of father Vismara translated into English ==
- Apostle of the Little Ones (original title (in Italian): Il Bosco delle Perle, translation by: Catherine Bolton) - PIME World Press - Detroit, Michigan, 1998 - 171 pages, ISBN 0-9642010-7-0

== Bibliography ==
- Good News at 7:18 - Piero Gheddo - Pime World Press - Detroit, Michigan, 1996 - 108 pages (facts about Vismara in chapter 4) - ISBN 0-9642010-1-1.
- (in Italian) Positio super vita, virtutibus et fama sanctitatis Clementis Vismara, by Francesca Consolini, Congregation for Sainthood Causes, Rome, Italy July 2001, 620 pages. The title, translated from Latin, reads: Facts about Clement Vismara's life, virtues and fame of holiness. The ”Positio” is the summary of the proceedings of “Diocesan Process”, commonly referred to as ”Public Copy”. The ”Positio” consists of a chronology, a summary of interviews with 123 witnesses and a documented biography. The ”Public Copy” is composed of nine volumes of 450 pages each containing all the known and relevant material: all Vismara's articles, his 1884 letters, all the testimonies and all that was written about him.
- (in Italian) Prima del sole – L’avventura missionaria di padre Clemente Vismara (tr.: Before sunrise - The missionary adventure of fr. Clement Vismara) – Piero Gheddo, EMI – Bologna, Italy, 1998 3 ed., 222 pages
