= Diocese of Kengtung =

Latin Catholic diocese in Myanmar

Coordinates: 21°17′N 99°36′E

Diocese of Kengtung Dioecesis Kengtunghensis

Location
- Country: Myanmar
- Ecclesiastical province: Taunggyi
- Metropolitan: Taunggyi

Statistics
- Area: 45,856 km^{2} (17,705 sq mi)
- Population: Total; Catholics: (as of 2006); 1,028,000; 58,000 (5.6%)
- Members: denomination = Catholic Church

Information
- Sui iuris church: Latin Church
- Rite: Roman Rite
- Established: 27 April 1927 (As Prefecture Apostolic of Kengtung); 26 May 1950 (As Vicariate Apostolic of Kengtung); 1 January 1955 (As Diocese of Kengtung)
- Cathedral: Cathedral of the Immaculate Heart of Mary in Kengtung

Current leadership
- Pope: Leo XIV
- Bishop: John Saw Yaw Han
- Metropolitan Archbishop: Basilio Athai

The Diocese of Kengtung (Lat: Diocesis Kengtunghensis) is a Latin Catholic diocese of the Catholic Church in Burma.

Erected in 1927 as the Apostolic Prefecture of Kengtung, the prefecture was created from territory in the Apostolic Vicariate of Eastern Burma.

In 1950, the Prefecture was elevated to an apostolic vicariate. In 1955, the vicariate was elevated to a full diocese and became suffragan to the Archdiocese of Taunggyi.

With the increases in the Catholic population, in 1975 the apostolic prefecture of Lashio was split off from the diocese of Kengtung, eventually expanding to the Diocese of Lashio.

== Ordinaries ==
- Erminio Bonetta, P.I.M.E. † (21 Jun 1927 Appointed – 1949 Died)
- Ferdinand Guercilena, P.I.M.E. † (31 May 1950 Appointed – 6 May 1973 Died)
- Abraham Than (19 Sep 1972 Appointed – 2 Oct 2001 Resigned)
- Peter Louis Cakü † (2 Oct 2001 Appointed – 20 Feb 2020 Died)
- John Saw Yaw Han (4 Nov 2022 Appointed – present)

== See also ==
- Catholic Church in Burma
- Clement Vismara (1897–1988), missionary
