= Caritas Aotearoa New Zealand =

Catholic development aid and relief organisation in New Zealand

- Established: 1966; 60 years ago
- Founder: New Zealand Catholic Bishops' Conference
- Type: Nonprofit
- Registration no.: CC36055
- Purpose: social justice
- Location: Wellington, New Zealand
- Coordinates: 41.2720°S 174.7825°E
- Origins: Catholic Social Teaching
- Region served: New Zealand
- Services: humanitarian aid, development aid, advocacy
- Chief Executive: Mena Antonio
- Affiliations: Caritas Internationalis; Caritas Oceania; Council for International Development
- Revenue: 5,716,611 NZD (2023)
- Expenses: 5,498,628 NZD (2023)
- Website: www.caritas.org.nz

Caritas Aotearoa New Zealand is a not-for-profit social justice and humanitarian relief organisation in New Zealand.

It is a service of the Catholic Church in New Zealand and a member of both the global Caritas Internationalis and the regional Caritas Oceania networks. It is also a member of the national Council for International Development.

== History ==
Following the Second Vatican Council (1962–1965) and the increased awareness on social issues and justice within the Catholic Church, the Bishops' Conference of New Zealand established a national commission to review the Church's overseas aid and mission activities. This initiative led to a conference in 1968, where the bishops decided to create three distinct organisations: the National Coordinating Committee for Catholic Overseas Aid (COAC), the Catholic Commission for Justice and Peace (CCJP), and the Catholic Overseas Volunteer Service (COVS). The COAC became a member of Caritas Internationalis in 1975.

In 1978, the bishops decided to merge the functions of aid, development, justice, and peace into a single entity, creating the New Zealand Catholic Commission for Evangelisation, Justice & Development (NZCCEJD). Ten years later, the organisation was renamed the Catholic Commission for Justice, Peace and Development (Aotearoa–New Zealand).

In 1992, following a review of national and diocesan structures for justice, peace, and development, the Bishops' Conference established three distinct entities: Caritas Aotearoa New Zealand, tasked with overseas aid and development; the Catholic Commission for Justice and Peace, responsible for advising on social issues and educational initiatives; and the Catholic Office for Social Justice, which supported the other two bodies.

Finally, in 1998, these three entities were unified in Caritas Aotearoa New Zealand – the Catholic Agency for Justice Peace and Development. Its mission remains focused on educating and forming the Catholic community in social justice principles and advocating for justice both domestically and internationally.

In 2023, 53% of the organisation's income was derived from individual donors, while 43% came from the Ministry of Foreign Affairs and Trade.

== Work ==
Internationally, Caritas Aotearoa New Zealand collaborates with the global Caritas network to deliver aid and support to communities affected by conflict, natural disasters, and climate change. It also funds development projects aimed at improving education, healthcare, and livelihoods in Africa, Asia, Latin America, the Middle-East and the Pacific. In 2023, Caritas New Zealand's projects supported 240,00 people during emergencies and over 138,000 people with livelihood activities, including WASH, food security, vocational training and climate change adaptation.

Domestically, the organisation works to raise awareness of social justice issues within the Catholic community, offers educational resources, and advocates for policies that address inequality, promote human dignity, and protect the environment. Its programmes engage schools, parishes, and individuals in fostering solidarity and taking practical action to combat injustice.
