= Jerzens =

- Municipality
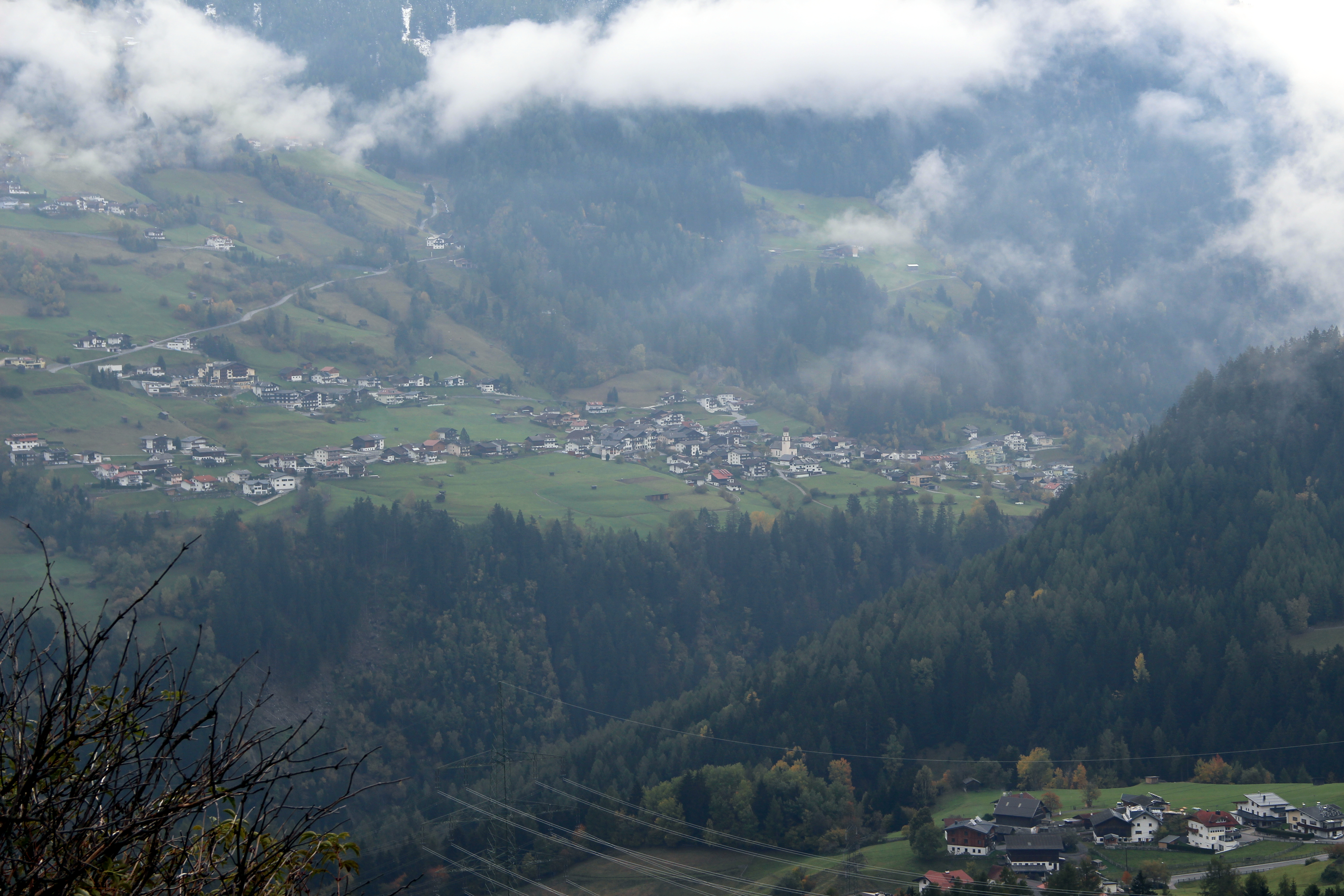

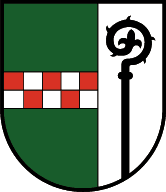
- Coat of arms

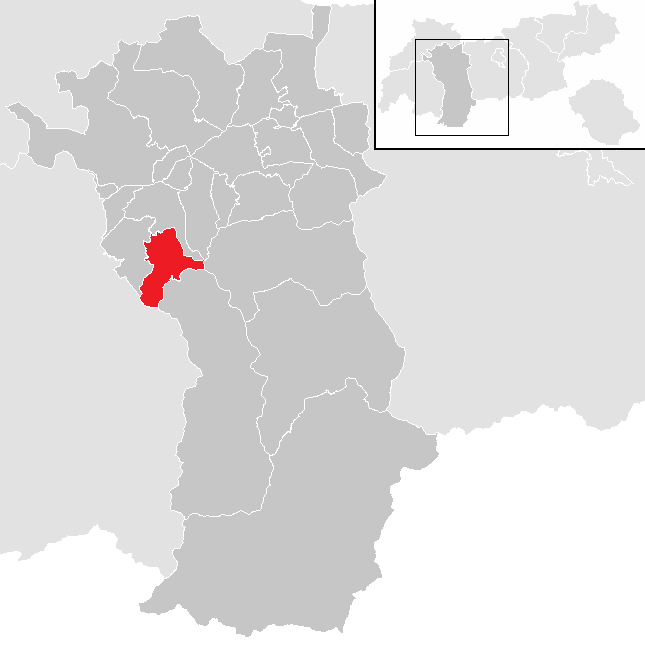
- Location in the district

- Location within Austria
- Coordinates: 47°08′58″N 10°44′52″E
- Country: Austria
- State: Tyrol
- District: Imst

Government
  - Mayor: Josef Reinstadler (Gemeinsam für Jerzens)

Area
  - Total: 30.43 km^{2} (11.75 sq mi)
- Elevation: 1,107 m (3,632 ft)

Population (2021-01-01)
  - Total: 944
  - Density: 31.0/km^{2} (80.3/sq mi)
- Time zone: UTC+1 (CET)
  - Summer (DST): UTC+2 (CEST)
- Postal code: 6474
- area code: 05414
- Vehicle registration: IM
- Website: www.jerzens.tirol.gv.at

Jerzens is a municipality and a village in the district of Imst (district) and is located 8 km south of Imst at the Pitze River in the valley with the same name. Settlement of the area began around 600. The village was mentioned in a register in 1313 for the first time. Jerzens has 1008 inhabitants and its main source of income is agriculture and tourism.

== Population ==
Historical population
Year	Pop.	±%
1869	864	—
1880	685	−20.7%
1890	623	−9.1%
1900	603	−3.2%
1910	607	+0.7%
1923	550	−9.4%
1934	592	+7.6%
1939	593	+0.2%
1951	673	+13.5%
1961	686	+1.9%
1971	775	+13.0%
1981	820	+5.8%
1991	911	+11.1%
2001	907	−0.4%
2011	1,026	+13.1%

== Notable people ==
- Wolfgang Auderer - professional freestyle skier
