= Caritas Australia =

Australian Catholic humanitarian agency

- Caritas Australia Limited
- Predecessor: 1962–1964: Catholic Church Relief Fund (CCRF)
- Established: 1964; 62 years ago
- Type: Nonprofit
- Legal status: Public Benevolent Institution, Registered Charity
- Headquarters: Mascot, New South Wales, Australia
- Location: Mascot, Sydney, Australia
- Coordinates: 33.92581°S 151.18824°E
- Origins: Catholic Social Teaching
- Region served: worldwide
- Fields: social work
- CEO: Kirsten Sayers
- Main organ: board of directors
- Affiliations: Caritas Oceania, Caritas Internationalis, ACFID
- Budget: Part of Australia's Official Development Assistance (ODA); specific figures available in annual reports (2023–2024)
- Revenue: 45.8 million AUD (2023)
- Expenses: 54.6 million AUD (2023)
- Funding: private donations (62%), one-off government grants (32%), other (7%)
- Staff: 137 (2023)
- Volunteers: Community and office-based volunteers across Australia; active in fundraising, advocacy, and support roles (Ongoing volunteer engagement; includes long-term and seasonal volunteers across Australia)
- Students: Thousands of students from Catholic schools across Australia participate annually in Project Compassion and educational initiatives (Thousands of students participate annually in Project Compassion and Caritas-led educational programs)
- Award: Caritas Australia Art Award (annual student recognition)
- Website: www.caritas.org.au
- Formerly called: 1964–1966: Catholic Overseas Relief Committee (CORC); 1966–1996: Australian Catholic Relief

Caritas Australia is an Australian Catholic agency for development cooperation and humanitarian aid.

Caritas is a member of Caritas Internationalis and its region Caritas Oceania, as well as of the Australian Council for International Development (ACFID).

== History ==
Caritas Australia's predecessor was the Catholic Church Relief Fund (CCRF), established in 1962 and whose name was changed two years to Episcopal Committee for Catholic Overseas Relief (COR). Later that same year, in 1964, the Catholic Bishops started the Catholic Overseas Relief Executive Committee, whose members were lay people. It became the Australian Catholic Relief in 1966 and Caritas Australia in 1996.

In the 1960s, parish communities in Adelaide, Sydney and Wagga Wagga were collecting funds during Lent for missionary projects and activities to reduce poverty at home and abroad. This practice, renamed "Project Compassion" in 1965 and adopted by all Australians dioceses, developed over the years and is still Caritas Australia's main fundraising appeal.

== Activities ==
Caritas Australia works according to the localisation principle, meaning that it supports local partner organisations and communities abroad and does not implement activities directly through country offices. In 2022 and 2023, the organisation worked with 90 partner organisations in 36 countries in Africa, Asia, Oceania and the Middle-East. Its projects supported around 1.5 million persons in need.

Within Australia, Caritas works with Indigenous Australians on programs that focus on strengthening cultural identity and spirituality, intergenerational healing, livelihood opportunities, as well as on advocacy.
