= List of Catholic dioceses in Papua New Guinea and Solomon Islands =

The Catholic Church in Papua New Guinea and Solomon Islands comprises only a Latin hierarchy, neither country has a national episcopal conference, but they jointly form the Episcopal Conference of Papua New Guinea and the Solomon Islands, comprising five ecclesiastical provinces, each headed by a Metropolitan Archbishop, and a total of seventeen suffragan bishoprics. There are no pre-diocesan, Eastern Catholic or other exempt jurisdictions. All defunct (often pre-diocesan missionary) jurisdictions are direct precursors of current sees. There is also an Apostolic Nunciature as papal diplomatic representation (embassy-level) to Papua New Guinea (at the national capital Port Moresby), in which the Apostolic Nunciature to the Solomon Islands is also vested. Episcopal Conference of Papua New Guinea and the Solomon Islands adopted a new logo in 2019.

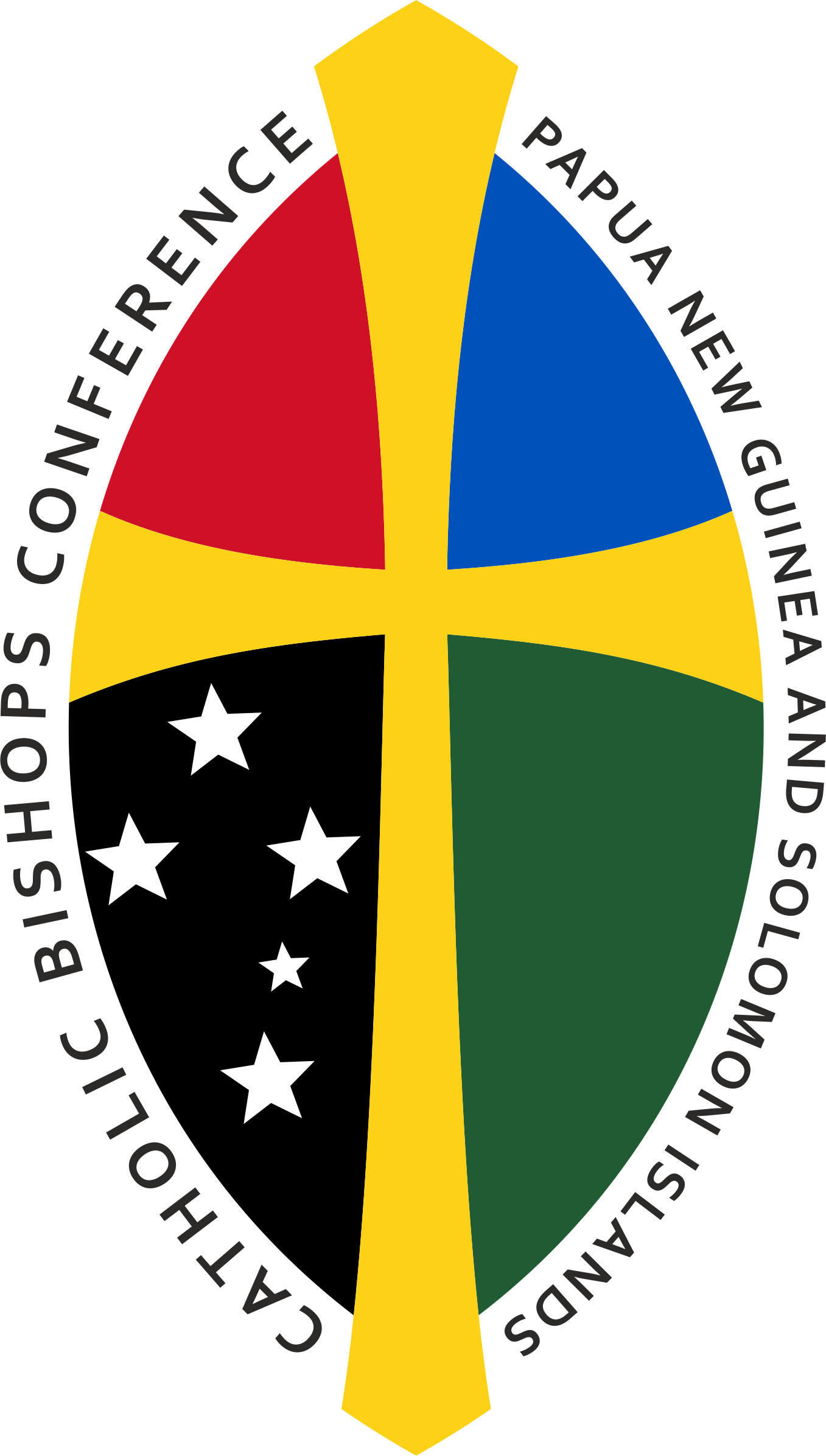
Logo of the Episcopal conference of Papua New Guinea and Solomon Islands.

== Current Latin sees in Papua New Guinea ==
=== Ecclesiastical Province of Madang ===
- Metropolitan Archdiocese of Madang
  - Diocese of Aitape
  - Diocese of Lae
  - Diocese of Vanimo
  - Diocese of Wewak

=== Ecclesiastical Province of Mount Hagen ===
- Metropolitan Archdiocese of Mount Hagen
  - Diocese of Goroka
  - Diocese of Kundiawa
  - Diocese of Mendi
  - Diocese of Wabag

=== Ecclesiastical Province of Port Moresby ===
- Metropolitan Archdiocese of Port Moresby
  - Diocese of Alotau-Sideia
  - Diocese of Bereina
  - Diocese of Daru-Kiunga
  - Diocese of Kerema

=== Ecclesiastical Province of Rabaul ===
- Metropolitan Archdiocese of Rabaul
  - Diocese of Bougainville
  - Diocese of Kavieng
  - Diocese of Kimbe

== Current Latin sees in the Solomon Islands ==
=== Ecclesiastical Province of Honiara ===
- Metropolitan Archdiocese of Honiara
  - Diocese of Auki
  - Diocese of Gizo

== See also ==
- List of Catholic dioceses (structured view)

== Sources and external links ==
- GCatholic.org - data for all sections.
- Catholic-Hierarchy entry.
