= Pontifical Institute for Foreign Missions =

Roman Catholic society of apostolic life

- Abbreviation: PIME
- Formation: July 30, 1850; 175 years ago
- Founder: Bishop Angelo Francesco Ramazzotti
- Type: Society of Apostolic Life of Pontifical Right (for Men)
- Headquarters: Via Monte Rosa, 81, 20149 Milan, Italy
- Members: 400 (2026)
- Superior General: Fr. Francesco Rapacioli
- Website: www.pime.org

The Pontifical Institute for Foreign Missions or PIME (Latin: Pontificium Institutum pro Missionibus Exteris; Italian: Pontificio Istituto Missioni Estere) is a Society of Apostolic Life formed by secular priests and consacrated brothers dedicated to the proclamation of the Gospel among peoples who have not yet heard of Jesus Christ. Faithful to its missionary charism ad gentes, PIME serves especially in regions where the Church is young, emerging, or not yet firmly established, working to form and strengthen local Christian communities and Churches. PIME Missionaries are present in: Algeria, Bangladesh, Brazil, Cambodia, Cameroon, Chad, Guinea-Bissau, Hong Kong, India, Indonesia (with the Bounded Missionary Families project),Italy, Ivory Coast, Japan, Mexico, Myanmar, Papua New Guinea, Philippines, Thailand, Tunisia and United States.

== History ==
The Pontifical Institute for Foreign Missions (PIME) traces its origins to two missionary seminaries founded independently in Italy: the Lombard Seminary for Foreign Missions, established in Milan in 1850, and the Pontifical Seminary of Saints Peter and Paul for Foreign Missions, founded in Rome in 1874. Both institutions were created to prepare diocesan priests for missionary service in countries where the Gospel had not yet been proclaimed. In 1926, Pope Pius XI united the two seminaries into a single missionary institute, officially establishing PIME.

Today, PIME is an international community of nearly 400 missionaries serving in 19 countries across Asia, Africa, Latin America, and Oceania

The institute opened its North American Regional headquarters in Detroit in 1947 at the invitation of Cardinal Edward Mooney, Archbishop of Detroit.

== The Missionary Charism of PIME ==
Since its foundation, the Pontifical Institute for Foreign Missions (PIME) has been guided by four pillars that express its distinctive missionary charism: ad gentes, ad extra, ad vitam, and in unum.

Ad Gentes – To All Peoples

PIME missionaries are sent ad gentes, "to the nations." Their primary calling is to reach those who have not yet encountered Jesus Christ and to serve in places where the Church is still small, emerging, or lacking sufficient resources. Inspired by Christ's command to "go and make disciples of all nations," PIME seeks to bring the Gospel to the geographical and existential frontiers of humanity.

Ad Extra – Beyond One's Own Homeland

Missionaries are called ad extra, beyond the boundaries of their own country, culture, and language. Like Abraham, who left his homeland trusting in God's promise, PIME missionaries leave behind the familiarity of their roots to live among other peoples and cultures. This experience involves the vulnerability of becoming a foreigner in a foreign land, but it is also a source of profound enrichment. Living between cultures, missionaries become bridges between Churches, helping local communities to discover the universal dimension of the Catholic faith.

Ad Vitam – For Life

Missionary service in PIME is not a temporary commitment but a lifelong vocation. Missionaries offer themselves ad vitam—for life and with their whole life. This commitment reflects a total gift of self to God and to the people among whom they are sent. Mission is not simply an activity that one performs; it becomes a way of life, shaping one's identity, relationships, and future. Through perseverance and fidelity, missionaries accompany communities over the long term, sharing both their struggles and their hopes.

In Unum – Together in Christ

The fourth pillar of the PIME charism is in unum—together, in unity. Although this expression has gained renewed prominence in recent decades, the reality it describes has been present since the Institute's origins. The founders of PIME understood that mission cannot be carried out in isolation. Missionaries bear fruit when they live and work as members of a common family, united by a shared vocation and purpose. The expression in unum has deep biblical roots. It evokes the Pentecost community, where the disciples "were all together" when the Holy Spirit descended upon them (Acts 2:1), and Jesus' prayer that his disciples "may be one" so that the world may believe (John 17:21). It also recalls Christ's mission "to gather into one the scattered children of God" (John 11:52). For PIME, in unum means more than simply living side by side. It expresses a dynamic movement toward communion in Christ— the One who unites people of different nations, cultures, and histories into a single missionary family. It is a communion of life, prayer, discernment, and missionary service that makes the proclamation of the Gospel credible.

== Venerated members of the Institute ==
=== Saints ===
- Alberico Crescitelli (30 June 1863 – 21 July 1900), missionary martyred in China, canonized on 1 October 2000

=== Blesseds ===
- Giovanni Battista Mazzucconi (1 March 1826 – 7 September 1855), missionary martyred in Papua New Guinea, beatified on 19 February 1984
- Paolo Manna (16 January 1872 – 15 September 1952), missionary and Superior General for PIME, beatified on 4 November 2001
- Mario Vergara (16 November 1910 – 24 May 1950), missionary martyred in Myanmar, beatified on 24 May 2014
- Alfredo Cremonesi (15 May 1902 – 7 February 1953), missionary martyred in Myanmar, beatified on 19 October 2019
- Clemente Vismara (6 September 1897 – 15 June 1988), missionary to Myanmar, beatified on 26 June 2011

=== Venerables ===
- Angelo Francesco Ramazzotti (3 August 1800 – 24 September 1861), Patriarch of Venice and founder of the Institute, declared Venerable on 14 December 2015
- Carlo Salerio (22 March 1827 - 29 September 1870), founder of the Institute of the Sisters of Reparation, declared Venerable on 13 May 2019
- Felice Tantardini (28 June 1898 - 23 March 1991), brother of the Institute, declared Venerable on 11 June 2019

=== Servants of God ===
- Silvio Pasquali (5 April 1864 - 17 December 1924), founder of the Catechist Sisters of Saint Ann, declared as a Servant of God on 3 December 2014
- Pietro Manghisi (21 January 1889 – 15 February 1953), missionary martyred in Myanmar
- Giuseppe Obert (1 April 1890 - 6 March 1972), Bishop of Dinajpur and founder of the Catechist Sisters of the Immaculate Heart of Mary, Queen of Angels (Shanti Rani Sisters)
- Mario Bortoletto (17 May 1938 - 9 March 2009), priest of the diocese of Treviso and associate of the Institute
