= Diocese of Kerema =

Latin Catholic diocese in Papua New Guinea

Coordinates: 7.9584°S 145.7723°E

Diocese of Kerema Dioecesis Keremana

Location
- Country: Papua New Guinea
- Headquarters: Kerema

Statistics
- Area: 34,472 km^{2} (13,310 sq mi)
- Population: Total; Catholics: (as of 2023); 163,385; 23,400 (14.3%)
- Parishes: 11

Information
- Denomination: Catholic Church
- Sui iuris church: Latin Church
- Rite: Roman Rite
- Established: 16 January 1971; 55 years ago

Current leadership
- Pope: Leo XIV
- Bishop: Pedro Centeno Baquero, S.D.B.
- Metropolitan Archbishop: John Ribat, M.S.C.

The Diocese of Kerema is a Latin Catholic suffragan diocese of the Archdiocese of Port Moresby. It was erected in 1971 from separated parts of the Dioceses of Bereina and Mendi.

== Bishops ==
=== Ordinaries ===
- Virgil Patrick Copas, M.S.C. (1976–1988), Archbishop (personal title)
- Paul John Marx, M.S.C. (1988–2010)
- Patrick Taval, M.S.C. (2010-2013)
- Pedro Centeno Baquero, S.D.B. (2017-)

=== Coadjutor bishops ===
- Paul John Marx, M.S.C. (1985-1988)
- Patrick Taval, M.S.C. (2007-2010)

=== Auxiliary bishop ===
- Rochus Josef Tatamai, M.S.C. (2005–2007), appointed Bishop of Bereina

== External links and references ==
- "Diocese of Kerema". Catholic-Hierarchy.
- "Bishop Rochus Tatamai, M.S.C." Catholic-Hierarchy.
