= William Kevin Rowell =

Australian bishop (1927–1986)

The Most Reverend William Kevin Rowell OFM
- Bishop of Aitape
- Diocese: Aitape
- Installed: 24 February 1970
- Term ended: 10 October 1986
- Predecessor: Ignatius John Doggett
- Successor: Brian James Barnes

Orders
- Ordination: 25 July 1954 at St Patrick's Cathedral, Melbourne by Justin Daniel Simonds
- Consecration: 24 February 1970 at St Ignatius' Church, Aitape by Gino Paro

Personal details
- Born: William Rowell; 27 October 1927 Korumburra, Victoria, Australia
- Died: 10 October 1986 (aged 58) Aitape, Sandaun Province, Papua New Guinea
- Denomination: Catholic Church
- Occupation: Catholic bishop
- Motto: Omnia et in omnibus Christus (Christ is all and in all)

William Kevin Rowell (27 October 1927 – 10 October 1986) was an Australian prelate of the Catholic Church who served as the second Bishop of Aitape.

== Early life ==
Born in Korumburra, Victoria. His father passed away when he was just 9 years old. He was educated at St Augustine's Orphanage, Geelong before joining St Joseph's College, Geelong, both run by the Congregation of Christian Brothers. He then moved to St Bonaventure's College, Waverley, Greyfriars Mornington, then St Paschal's College, Box Hill where he completed his priestly formation.

== Priesthood ==
Rowell was ordained to the priesthood on 25 July 1954 at St Patrick's Cathedral, Melbourne by Archbishop Justin Daniel Simonds. He celebrated his first Mass the following day at St Paschal's, Box Hill.

His first assignment was at Our Lady Morning Star, Boy's Home in Mornington, a Catholic Reformatory school conducted by the Franciscans in conjunction with the Victorian Welfare Department. He then moved to the Aitape Mission, serving under Bishop Ignatius John Doggett. In 1969, he was appointed to serve as superior of the Franciscan mission in Aitape.

In 1961, he left Papua New Guinea for Rome to complete a Doctorate in Canon Law. He studied at the Pontifical University of Saint Anthony, known as the Antonianum. In 1964, he completed his doctoral dissertation, De superiore regulariis missionibus Ordinis Fratrum Minorum (On the Regular Superior in the Missions of the Order of Friars Minor), exploring the legal, structural, and pastoral role of regular superiors within the missionary territories managed by the Franciscan Order.

== Episcopate ==
Rowell was appointed Bishop of Aitape on 15 December 1969 following the resignation of Bishop Ignatius John Doggett. He was consecrated by Archbishop Gino Paro, Apostolic Delegate to Australia and Papua New Guinea, on 24 February 1970 at St Ignatius' Church, Aitape.

In April 1970, he celebrated Mass following the Solemn Profession of the first native Papua New Guinean to take final vows, Brother Hilary Kapaith OFM.

As bishop, he helped to build up facilities in the otherwise remote diocese. In 1976, he asked Brother Charles Barry, a Patrician Brother, to set up a school from scratch in the vicinity of the inland mission station of Nuku. Along with another brother, they trekked the forty kilometres inland to begin building the new school, living out of tents with no electricity for four months as it was constructed.

The Diocese of Aitape was largely made up of religious orders. Franciscan priests, brothers, sisters and lay workers were supported by the Presentation Sisters, Poor Clare Sisters, Handmaids of the Lord and Sisters of St Joseph of the Sacred Heart formed part of the Diocesan family under Rowell's leadership.

He appointed Austen Robin Crapp, a fellow Franciscan, as his Vicar General. Crapp would later serve as Bishop of Aitape from 1999 to 2009.

In 1977, Rowell made an urgent plea to the Sisters of Mercy in Australia to send qualified nursing staff to the Raihu hospital in Aitape on a temporary basis. He described the situation as a "crisis". The hospital had been managed by Franciscan Sisters of the Divine Motherhood from England, however they had been recalled by their order. The three young sisters were required to maintain a 100-bed hospital and health services until another religious order could be found to carry out the work long-term.

In 1980, he invited the Congregation of the Holy Spirit from the Canadian province to serve in the Diocese. Rowell was described by the Spiritans as having a "quiet wisdom and unfailing kindness".

== Death ==
Rowell died on 10 October 1986 in Australia, while still in office.

His legacy in Papua New Guinea remains. A building in the Catholic mission complex in Aitape is named Rowell House and a bridge in the area (Rowell Bridge) is also named after him.

Catholic Church titles
Preceded by Ignatius John Doggett	Bishop of Aitape; 1970–1986	Succeeded by Brian James Barnes
