= Louis Vangeke =

Papua New Guinean Catholic prelate (1904–1982)

His Excellency, The Most Reverend, Sir Louis Vangeke M.S.C., KBE
- Bishop of Bereina
- Church: Catholic Church; Latin Church
- Diocese: Bereina
- Appointed: 1 March 1976
- Term ended: 30 October 1979
- Predecessor: Eugène Klein
- Successor: Benedict To Varpin
- Other post: Bishop Emeritus of Bereina (1979‍–‍1982)
- Previous posts: Auxiliary Bishop of Port Moresby, Papua New Guinea (1970‍–‍1976); Titular Bishop of Culusi (1970‍–‍1976); Bishop of Bereina (1976‍–‍1979)

Personal details
- Born: 25 Jun 1904 Ongofoina, Beipa'a, Territory of Papua
- Died: 15 December 1982 (aged 78) Beipa'a, Papua New Guinea
- Buried: Beipa'a

Ordination history
History
Episcopal consecration
- Principal consecrator: Pope Paul VI
- Co-consecrators: Virgil Patrick Copas, Eugène Klein
Episcopal succession
Bishops consecrated by Louis Vangeke as principal consecrator
- Benedict To Varpin: 1980

Sir Louis Vangeke, M.S.C. KBE (1904–1982) was a Papua New Guinean prelate of the Catholic Church who served as the bishop of the Diocese of Bereina in Papua New Guinea from 1976 to 1979. Prior to that he was the auxiliary bishop of the Archdiocese of Port Moresby, also in Papua New Guinea. Vangeke was consecrated as a bishop on 3 December 1970 by Pope Paul VI at St Mary's Cathedral in Sydney, Australia. He was the first indigenous Papua New Guinean Catholic bishop.

Vangeke was appointed a Knight Companion of the Order of the British Empire (KBE) in the 1980 Birthday Honours. Vangeke died in 1982, aged 78.
