= Siby Mathew Peedikayil =

Indian Roman Catholic bishop (born 1970)

His Excellency Siby Mathew Peedikayil
- Bishop of Aitape
- Church: Roman Catholic Church
- Archdiocese: Archdiocese of Madang
- Diocese: Diocese of Aitape
- In office: 13 may 2021
- Predecessor: Otto Separy
- Previous posts: Pastor in various parishes in Kerala, general vicar at diocese of Vanimo

Orders
- Ordination: 1 February 1995
- Consecration: 26 September 2021 by John Ribat

Personal details
- Born: 6 December 1970 (age 55) Meloram
- Education: St. Albert's College in Ranchi
- Motto: The love of Christ impels us
- Coat of arms

Styles of Siby Mathew Peedikayil
- Reference style: The Most Reverend
- Spoken style: Your Excellency
- Religious style: Monsignor
- Posthumous style: none

Siby Mathew Peedikayil (born December 6, 1970, in Meloram) is an Indian clergyman and bishop for the Roman Catholic Diocese of Aitape.

== Biography ==
Born in 1970 in a small village in Kerala, he professed as a member of Heralds of Good News (HGN) in 1986, and was ordained a priest for that society of apostolic life on 1 February 1995. In 1998 he was as missionary in Papua New-Guinea, wher came-back in India in 2004.

He was again as missionary in Papua New-Guinea and was appointed bishop in May 2021, and consecrated on 26 Sep 2021 by Cardinal John Ribat.

== See also ==
- Catholic Church in India
