= Pedro Centeno Baquero =

Filipino Roman Catholic bishop (born 1970)

Pedro Centeno Baquero SDB
- Bishop of Kerema
- Church: Catholic Church
- Diocese: Diocese of Kerema
- Appointed: 20 January 2017
- Predecessor: Patrick Taval

Orders
- Ordination: 8 December 1999
- Consecration: 25 March 2017 by John Ribat

Personal details
- Born: 15 September 1970 (age 56) Manila, Philippines

Pedro Centeno Baquero (born on September 15, 1970 in Manila) is a Filipino clergyman and bishop for the Roman Catholic Diocese of Kerema. He was appointed bishop in 2017.

Born on September 15, 1970, he made his perpetual profession to the Salesians of Don Bosco in 1998, and was ordained to the priesthood on December 8, 1999. On January 20, 2017, he was appointed by Pope Francis as the Bishop for the Roman Catholic Diocese of Kerema. On March 25, 2017, on the Solemnity of the Annunciation of the Lord, he was consecrated as bishop at the Cathedral of the Holy Spirit, Kerema, by Cardinal John Ribat, Archbishop of Port Moresby, with Archbishop Francesco Panfilo, of Rabaul, and Archbishop Kurian Mathew Vayalunkal, Apostolic Nuncio to the Solomon Islands, as co-consecrators. He took canonical possession of the diocese at the moment of his ordination.
