= Giovanni Battista de Rossi =

Giovanni Battista de Rossi may refer to:

- Giovanni Battista de' Rossi (priest) (1698–1764), Italian Roman Catholic priest
- Giovanni Battista de Rossi (archaeologist) (1822–1894), Italian archaeologist
