= Archdiocese of Port Moresby =

Latin Catholic archdiocese in Papua New Guinea

Coordinates: 9.4667°S 147.1670°E

Archdiocese of Port Moresby Archidioecesis Portus Moresbiensis

Location
- Country: Papua New Guinea
- Headquarters: Port Moresby

Statistics
- Area: 29,874 km^{2} (11,534 sq mi)
- Population: Total; Catholics: (as of 2023); 792,000; 233,000 (29.4%)
- Parishes: 22

Information
- Denomination: Catholic Church
- Sui iuris church: Latin Church
- Rite: Roman Rite
- Established: 10 May 1889; 137 years ago
- Cathedral: St. Mary's Catholic Cathedral, Port Moresby

Current leadership
- Pope: Leo XIV
- Metropolitan Archbishop: John Ribat, M.S.C.

The Archdiocese of Port Moresby (Latin: Archidiœcesis Portus Moresbiensis) is a Latin Church ecclesiastical jurisdiction or archdiocese of the Catholic Church in Papua New Guinea. Its cathedral is in St. Mary's Cathedral, in Port Moresby, National Capital District.

== History ==
- Established on 10 May 1889 as Apostolic Vicariate of New Guinea on territory split off from the then Apostolic Vicariate of Melanesia.
- Renamed on 1922.11.14 as Apostolic Vicariate of Papua
- Renamed on 1946.06.13 as Apostolic Vicariate of Port Moresby, having lost territory to establish the Apostolic Prefecture of Samarai (now suffragan diocese Alotau-Sideia)
- Lost territory on 1958.11.13 to establish the Apostolic Prefecture of Mendi
- Lost territories on 1959.07.16 to establish the Apostolic Vicariate of Yule Island and the Apostolic Prefecture of Daru (now suffragan Diocese of Daru-Kiunga)
- Promoted on 1966.11.15 as Metropolitan Archdiocese of Port Moresby
- It enjoyed papal visits from Pope John Paul II in May 1984.05 and January 1995, and from Pope Francis in September 4-6, 2024.

== Bishops ==
=== Ordinaries ===
Apostolic Vicars of New Guinea

- Louis-André Navarre, Sacred Heart Missionaries (M.S.C.) (1889.05.10 – 1908.01), Titular Bishop of Pentacomia (1887.05.17 – 1888.08.17); died 1912.01.16
- Alain-Marie Guynot de Boismenu, M.S.C. (1908.01 – 1922.11.14 see below), Titular Bishop of Gabala (1899.05.23 – 1945.01.18), succeeded as former Coadjutor Apostolic Vicar of New Guinea (1899.05.23 – 1908.01)

Apostolic Vicar Papua

- Alain Guynot de Boismenu, M.S.C. (see above 1922.11.14 – retired 1946), later Titular Archbishop of Claudiopolis in Honoriade (1945.01.18 – death 1953.11.05)

Apostolic Vicars Port Moresby

- André Sorin, M.S.C. (1946.06.13 – death 1959.04.19), Titular Bishop of Antiphræ (1946.06.13 – 1959.04.19); previously Apostolic Administrator of Samarai (Papua New Guinea) (1946.06.13 – 1951.05.18)
- Apostolic Administrator Virgil Patrick Copas, M.S.C. (1959.12.19 – 1966.11.15 see below), Titular Bishop of Bennefa (1959.12.19 – 1966.11.15)

Metropolitan Archbishops of Port Moresby

- Virgil Patrick Copas, M.S.C. (see above 1966.11.15 – retired 1975.12.19), also Apostolic Administrator of suffragan see Bereina (Papua New Guinea) (1973 – 1976.03.01); later Archbishop-Bishop of Kerema (Papua New Guinea) (1976.05.24 – retired 1988.12.06); died 1993.10.03
- Herman To Paivu (1975.12.19 – death 1981.02.12), former Titular Bishop of Temuniana (1974.07.01 – 1975.12.19) & Auxiliary Bishop of Port Moresby (1974.07.01 – 1975.12.19)
- Peter Kurongku (1981.10.03 – death 1996.06.11); previously Titular Bishop of Sinnuara (1978.11.15 – 1981.10.03) & Auxiliary Bishop of Honiara (Solomon Islands) (1978.11.15 – 1981.10.03)
- Brian James Barnes, Friars Minor (O.F.M.) (14 June 1997 – 26 March 2008), previously Bishop of Aitape (Papua New Guinea) (1987.10.03 – 1997.06.14), President of Bishops’ Conference of Papua New Guinea and Solomon Islands (1993 – 1994); died 2017.05.09
- Sir John Ribat, KBE, M.S.C. (26 March 2008 - ...), also Cardinal (19 November 2016 - ...), President of Bishops’ Conference of Papua New Guinea and Solomon Islands (2011.05 – 2014.05), President of Federation of Catholic Bishops’ Conferences of Oceania (2014.05 – ...); previously Titular Bishop of Macriana minor (2000.10.30 – 2002.02.12) & Auxiliary Bishop of Bereina (Papua New Guinea) (2000.10.30 – 2002.02.12), succeeded as Bishop of Bereina (2002.02.12 – 2007.04.16), then Coadjutor Archbishop of Port Moresby (Papua New Guinea) (2007.04.16 – 2008.03.26)

=== Coadjutor bishops ===
- Stanislas Henri Verjus, M.S.C. (1889–1892), as Coadjutor Vicar Apostolic; did not succeed to see
- Alain Guynot de Boismenu, M.S.C. (1899–1908), as Coadjutor Vicar Apostolic
- John Ribat, M.S.C. (2007–2008); future Cardinal

=== Auxiliary bishops ===
- Louis Vangeke, M.S.C. (1970–1976), appointed Bishop of Bereina
- Herman To Paivu (1974–1975), appointed Archbishop here
- Cherubim Alfred Dambui (2000–2010)

== Province ==
Its ecclesiastical province comprises the Metropolitan's own archdiocese and the following suffragan dioceses:

- Diocese of Alotau-Sideia
- Diocese of Bereina
- Diocese of Daru-Kiunga
- Diocese of Kerema

== Sources and external links ==
- GCatholic with incumbent biography links
