= Gérard-Joseph Deschamps =

Canadian Roman Catholic bishop (1929–2022)

Gérard-Joseph Deschamps SMM
- Bishop of Bereina
- Church: Catholic Church
- Diocese: Diocese of Bereina
- In office: 2 January 1999 – 12 February 2002
- Predecessor: Luke Paul Matlatarea
- Successor: John Ribat
- Previous posts: Bishop of Daru-Kiunga (1987-1999); Bishop of Daru (1966-1987); Prefect of Daru (1961-1966)

Orders
- Ordination: 13 March 1954 by Marie-Joseph Lemieux
- Consecration: 21 January 1967 by Sergio Pignedoli

Personal details
- Born: 4 July 1929 Eastview, Ontario, Canada, British Empire
- Died: 25 February 2022 (aged 92) Sainte-Dorothée, Quebec, Canada

Gérard-Joseph Deschamps (4 July 1929 – 25 February 2022) was a Canadian Roman Catholic prelate.

Deschamps was born in Eastview, Frontenac County, Ontario on 4 July 1929 and was ordained to the priesthood in 1954. He was Bishop of Daru in Papua New Guinea from 1966 until 1999, when he became bishop of the Roman Catholic Diocese of Bereina. He resigned in 2002, and died on 25 February 2022, at the age of 92.
