= San Giovanni Battista de' Rossi, Rome =

San Giovanni Battista de Rossi
- St. John the Baptist of Rossi (in English); Sancti Ioannes Baptistæ de Rossi ad Viam Latinam (in Latin)
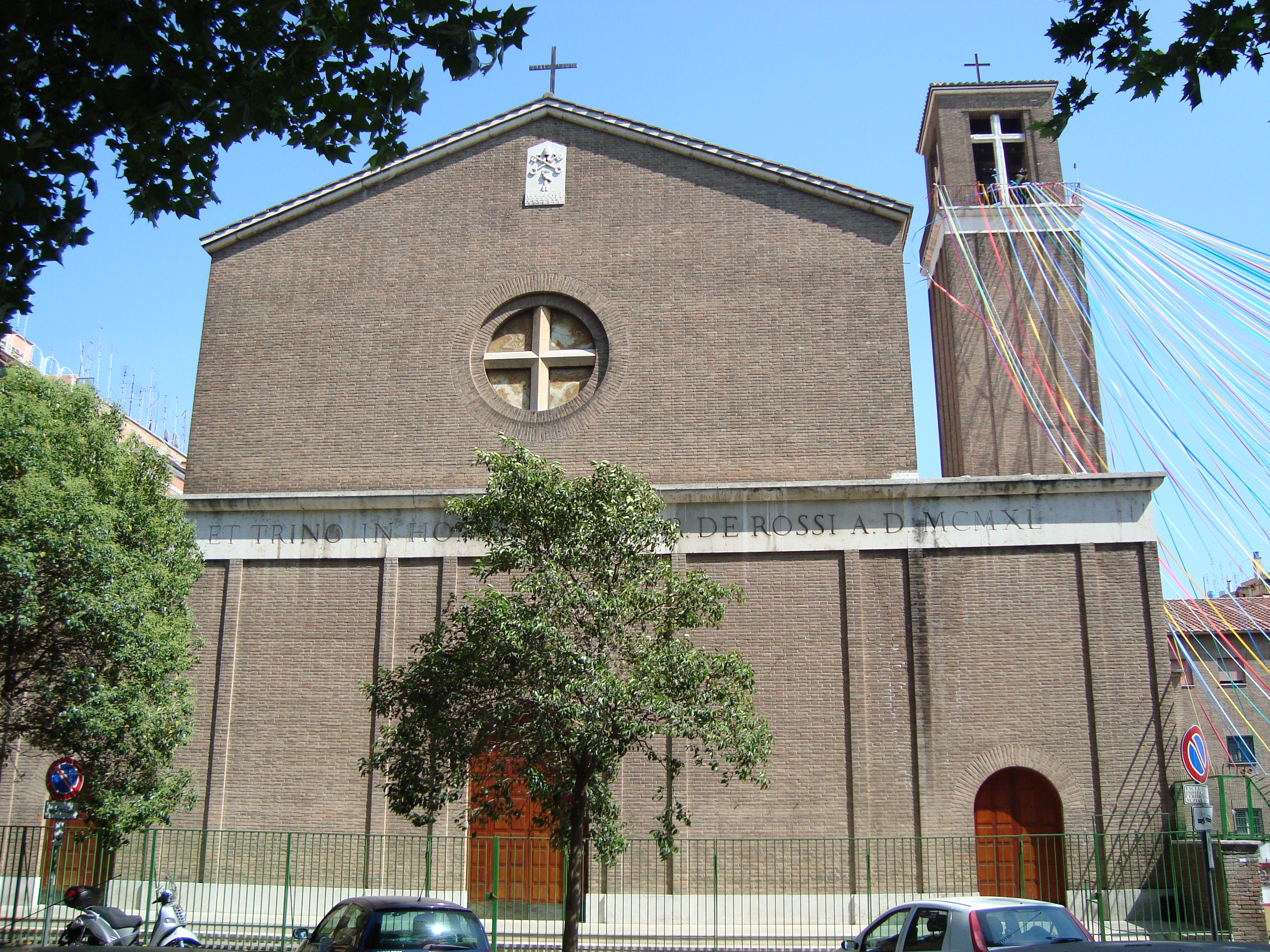
- Facade
- Click on the map for a fullscreen view
- 41°52′17″N 12°31′09″E
- Location: Via Cesare Baronio 127, Rome
- Country: Italy
- Denomination: Roman Catholic
- Tradition: Roman Rite
- Website: Official website

History
- Status: Titular church
- Dedication: Giovanni Battista de' Rossi
- Consecrated: 1965

Architecture
- Architect: Tullio Rossi
- Architectural type: Church
- Style: Rationalism
- Groundbreaking: 1938

Administration
- District: Lazio
- Province: Rome

San Giovanni Battista de Rossi is a church on via Cesare Baronio in the quartiere Appio-Latino of Rome, Italy. It is dedicated to Saint Giovanni Battista de' Rossi (1698–1764), who was canonized in 1881 by Pope Leo XIII.

This church building was commissioned by Pope Pius XII in 1938 from the architect Tullio Rossi. The Second World War delayed construction and the church was not consecrated until 22 May 1965. St John Baptist de Rossi's relics were translated here from the church of Santissima Trinità dei Pellegrini on 23 May 1965, his feast day, with Cardinal Luigi Traglia, the Vicar General of Rome, presiding.

== List of Cardinal Protectors ==
Nearly four years later, on 30 April 1969, Pope Paul VI made it a titular church.

- John Joseph Carberry (30 April 1969 – 17 June 1998)
- Julio Terrazas Sandoval (21 February 2001 – 9 December 2015)
- John Ribat (19 November 2016 – present)

The church itself is served by diocesan clergy.
