= Luke Paul Matlatarea =

Roman Catholic bishop from Papua New Guinea

Luke Paul Matlatarea MSC
- Bishop of Bereina
- Church: Catholic Church
- Diocese: Diocese of Bereina
- In office: 21 June 1988 – 28 March 1998
- Predecessor: Benedict To Varpin
- Successor: Gérard-Joseph Deschamps

Orders
- Ordination: 10 January 1971
- Consecration: 21 September 1988 by Albert-Leo Bundervoet

Personal details
- Born: 15 December 1938
- Died: 28 March 1998 (aged 59)

Luke Paul Matlatarea (born 15 December 1938 in Malmal – died 28 March 1998) was a Papua New Guinean clergyman and bishop for the Roman Catholic Diocese of Bereina. He was appointed bishop in 1988. He died in 1998.
