= Gilles Côté (bishop) =

Canadian Roman Catholic bishop

Gilles Côté SMM
- Bishop Emeritus of Daru-Kiunga
- Church: Catholic Church
- Diocese: Diocese of Daru-Kiunga
- In office: January 2, 1999 – May 23, 2021
- Predecessor: Gérard-Joseph Deschamps
- Successor: Joseph Durero
- Other post: Apostolic Administrator of Daru-Kiunga (2021)
- Previous posts: Titular Bishop of Cissa (1995-1999); Auxiliary Bishop of Daru-Kiunga (1995-1999)

Orders
- Ordination: December 19, 1970
- Consecration: April 23, 1995 by Gérard-Joseph Deschamps

Personal details
- Born: November 24, 1945 (age 80) Eastview, Ontario, Canada, British Empire

Gilles Côté (born 24 November 1945 in Vanier, Ottawa) is a Canadian clergyman and prelate of the Roman Catholic Church who served as the bishop for the Diocese of Daru-Kiunga. He was appointed bishop in 1999. He retired in 2021.
