= Eastview, Ontario =

Eastview, Ontario can mean the following:

- Eastview was the name of Vanier, Ontario before 1969. Vanier is now a neighbourhood of Ottawa.
- Eastview, Frontenac County, Ontario is a community in the city of Kingston
