= Diocese of Daru-Kiunga =

Latin Catholic diocese in Papua New Guinea

Coordinates: 6.1161°S 141.2980°E

Diocese of Daru-Kiunga Dioecesis Daruensis-Kiungana
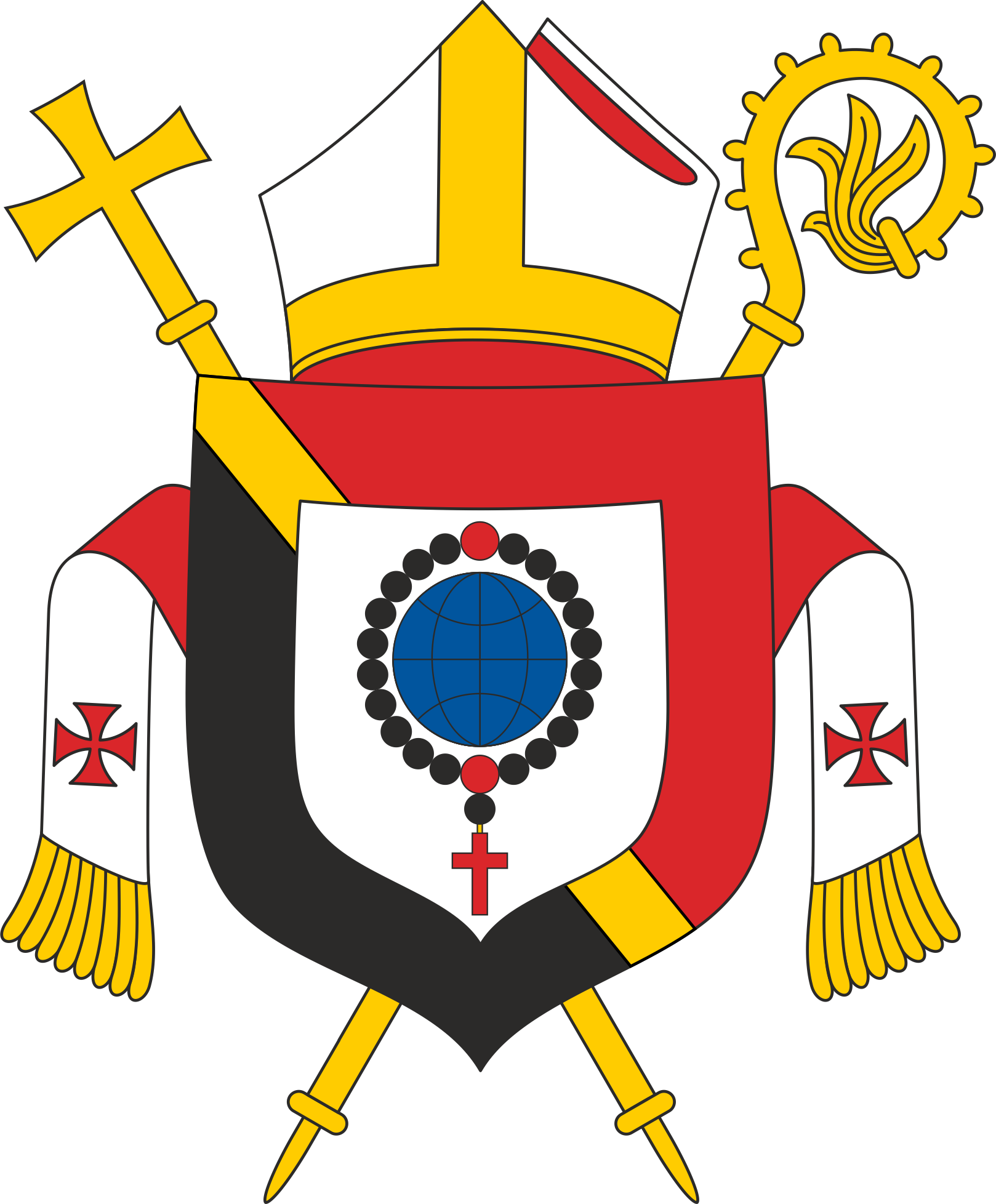
- Coat of arms

Location
- Country: Papua New Guinea
- Ecclesiastical region: Archdiocese of Port Moresby
- Headquarters: Kiunga

Statistics
- Area: 99,600 km^{2} (38,500 sq mi)
- Population: Total; Catholics: (as of 2023); 218,867; 54,097 (24.7%)
- Parishes: 13

Information
- Denomination: Catholic Church
- Sui iuris church: Latin Church
- Rite: Roman Rite
- Established: 16 July 1959; 66 years ago

Current leadership
- Pope: Leo XIV
- Bishop: Joseph Durero, SVD
- Metropolitan Archbishop: John Ribat, MSC
- Bishops emeritus: Gilles Côté, SMM

The Diocese of Daru-Kiunga is a Latin Catholic suffragan diocese of the Archdiocese of Port Moresby. It was erected as a prefecture apostolic in 1959 and elevated to a diocese in 1966.

== Bishops ==
=== Ordinaries ===
- Gérard-Joseph Deschamps, S.M.M. (1961–1999), appointed Bishop of Bereina
- Gilles Côté, S.M.M. (1999–2021) Retired
- Joseph Tarife Durero, S.V.D. (2021–present)

=== Auxiliary bishop ===
- Gilles Côté, S.M.M. (1995–1999), appointed Bishop here

== External links and references ==
- "Diocese of Daru-Kiunga". Catholic-Hierarchy.
