= Crapp =

Crapp is a surname. Notable people with this surname include:

- Austen Robin Crapp (1934–2024), Australian bishop
- Ivo Crapp (1872–1924), Australian rules football umpire
- Jack Crapp (1912–1981), English cricketer
- Lorraine Crapp (born 1938), Australian swimmer
