= Paul John Marx =

Catholic bishop of Kerema (Papua New Guinea)

Paul John Marx M.S.C.
- Bishop of Kerema
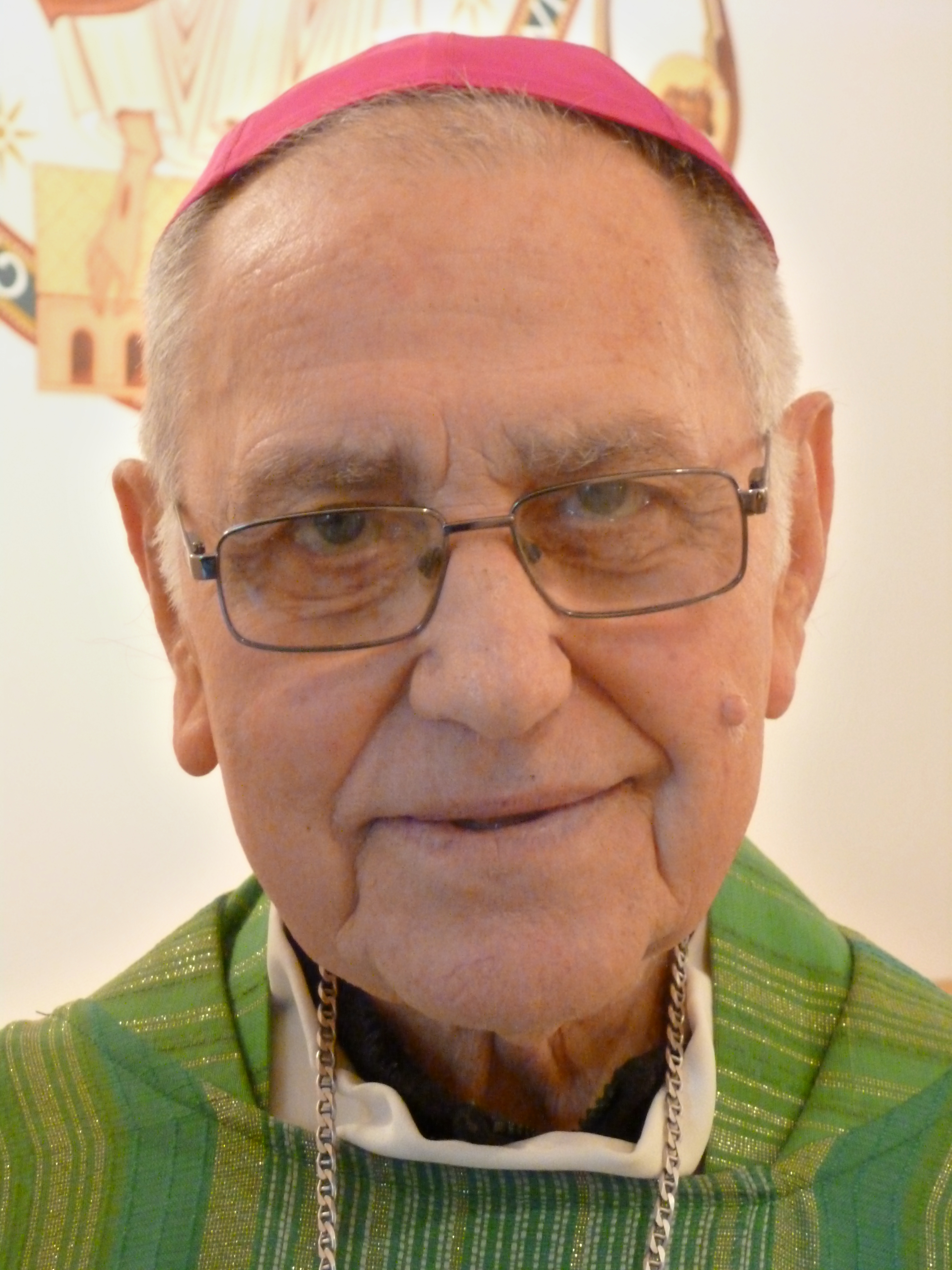
- Native name: Jean Paul Marx
- Church: Catholic Church
- Diocese: Diocese of Kerema
- In office: 6 December 1988 – 13 March 2010
- Predecessor: Virgil Patrick Copas
- Successor: Patrick Taval
- Previous post: Coadjutor Bishop of Kerema (1985-1988)

Orders
- Ordination: 29 June 1963
- Consecration: 13 December 1985 by Peter Kurongku

Personal details
- Born: 12 March 1935 Mutzig, Bas-Rhin, France
- Died: 19 June 2018 (aged 83)

Bishop Paul John Marx, M.S.C. (12 March 1935 – 19 June 2018) was a French Roman Catholic prelate, who was bishop of Kerema, Papua New Guinea from 6 December 1988 until 13 March 2010.

Marx was born in Mutzig, France. He was ordained by Archbishop Peter Kurongku as Priest of the Missionaries of the Sacred Heart of Jesus. He was appointed Coadjutor Bishop of Kerema on 13 December 1985, aged 50, and as Bishop of Kerema on 6 December 1988, aged 53.
