= Austen Robin Crapp =

Australian Roman Catholic bishop (1934–2024)

His Excellency Austen Robin Crapp CBE OFM
- Bishop Emeritus of Aitape
- Metropolis: Madang
- Appointed: 19 April 1999
- Term ended: 5 March 2009
- Predecessor: Brian James Barnes
- Successor: Otto Separy

Orders
- Ordination: 21 July 1959
- Consecration: 11 July 1999 by Benedict To Varpin

Personal details
- Born: Robin Crapp; 5 March 1934 Sydney, New South Wales, Australia
- Died: 6 March 2024 (aged 90) Randwick, New South Wales, Australia

Austen Robin Crapp, OFM (5 March 1934 – 6 March 2024) was an Australian prelate of the Roman Catholic Church.

== Early life ==
Crapp was born in Sydney, New South Wales, on 5 March 1934 to George and Monica Crapp, the eldest of three children. His birth name was Robin. The family lived in Leichhardt but moved to Tamworth due to his father's job with the Postmaster-General's Department. He received his primary education at St Nicholas' Primary School, Tamworth and his secondary education at Christian Brothers College, Tamworth. He grew up playing rugby league and was known for being vocal on the field.

His vocation to the priesthood began to form after a visiting Franciscan priest came to the high school and asked the students to consider joining the order to serve in its overseas missions. After leaving high school, he immediately joined the Order of Friars Minor and began his novitiate on 17 February 1952 at Campbelltown, New South Wales. He took the religious name of "Austen". He made his temporary profession on 19 February 1953 and his solemn profession on 3 March 1956.

== Priesthood ==
Crapp was ordained to the priesthood on 21 July 1959 in Armidale. He was initially assigned to Waverley. In 1961, he was appointed parish priest of Palm Island, Queensland, becoming the first pastor of the new St Anthony's Catholic Church on the island. He retained a strong connection to the island, returning in 2012 to help bless a new community cultural precinct, more than five decades after he served there.

In 1962, he was sent to Aitape, Papua New Guinea. He served as a missionary priest for four years, before being appointed chaplain of the Pacific Islands Regiment in Wewak. During his nine years as chaplain, he became known for his many crossings of the Kokoda Track, his squash abilities, and his service to the soldiers and civilians of the areas he served. He was also an avid golf player and found time to play while serving in Papua New Guinea.

In 1977, he was transferred to Igam Barracks, Lae. In 1980, he briefly returned to Australia, serving as chaplain to Lavarack Barracks in Townsville. He returned to Aitape in 1982 and served as missionary priest in the region.

In 1986, he was appointed Provincial Minister for the region, serving until 1993. In 1994, he was sent to Saint Paul University in Ottawa, Canada to complete studies in Canon law. He returned to Papua New Guinea in 1997 and was appointed Administrator of the Diocese of Aitape, after Bishop Brian James Barnes was appointed Archbishop of Port Moresby. During this time, he distinguished himself, through his decisive and pro-active handling of rescue and relief services following the 1998 Papua New Guinea earthquake.

During limited periods of leave, he would often return home to Tamworth to spend time with his family.

== Episcopate ==
On 19 April 1999, Crapp was appointed Bishop of Aitape by Pope John Paul II. He was consecrated a bishop by Archbishop Benedict To Varpin on 11 July 1999 at St Ignatius Cathedral, Aitape. He became the fourth and last Australian Franciscan to serve as bishop of the diocese.

He looked after a team of 124 mission workers: priests, brothers, sisters and lay volunteers. The diocese operated through three deaneries, with 24 parish centres serving 64,500 Catholics in an area of 12,000km. He attended Divine Word University in Madang to gain a Diploma in Business Administration to better understand the management process. He established a company known as the Aitape Foundation Service which encompassed eco-forestry sawmill, mechanical workshop, cattle farm, concrete manufactures, construction and rental of houses.

Crapp was appointed Commander of the Order of the British Empire (CBE) for services to the Church in the 2006 Birthday Honours, and in recognition of his service to the people of Papua New Guinea, especially after the 1998 tsunami.

== Retirement and death ==
Crapp retired as Bishop of Aitape on 5 March 2009, the day of his 75th birthday. He relocated to Deeragun, Queensland near Townsville where he resided until 2018, when he moved to the Star of the Sea Friary in Waverley. During his retirement, he would serve as chaplain on cruise ships and help to fundraise for missions in South America. He would also supply for local parishes in Townsville.

On 6 March 2024, the day after his 90th birthday, Crapp died at the Prince of Wales Hospital in Randwick, Sydney. His funeral was held at Mary Immaculate Church, Waverley on 25 March 2024. His remains were cremated and transferred to Aitape, Papua New Guinea where he was interred.

Catholic Church titles
Preceded by Brian James Barnes	Bishop of Aitape; 1999–2009	Succeeded by Otto Separy
