= Ignatius John Doggett =

Australian-born Catholic bishop

The Most Reverend Ignatius John Doggett OFM
- Bishop Emeritus of Aitape
- Diocese: Aitape
- Installed: 15 November 1966
- Term ended: 6 June 1969
- Successor: William Kevin Rowell
- Other posts: Prefect of Aitape (1952–1956); Vicar Apostolic of Aitape (1956–1966); Titular Bishop of Mundinitza (1956–1966); Titular Bishop of Menefessi (1969–1976)

Orders
- Ordination: 2 July 1933 at Rome
- Consecration: 26 February 1957 at Mary Immaculate Catholic Church, Waverley by Romolo Carboni

Personal details
- Born: John Doggett; 25 November 1907 Wattle Flat, New South Wales, Australia
- Died: 17 September 2004 (aged 96) Sydney, New South Wales, Australia
- Denomination: Catholic Church
- Occupation: Catholic bishop
- Motto: Corpus Christi aedificare (to build the body of Christ)

Ignatius John Doggett (25 November 1907 – 17 September 2004) was an Australian clergyman and first bishop of the Roman Catholic Diocese of Aitape.

== Early life ==
Doggett born in Wattle Flat, New South Wales to James and Sarah Doggett, and grew up in Rydal. He attended the Franciscan-run Bonaventure College, Rydal, then to Lithgow High School and later at Holy Cross College, Ryde.

From a young age, he had a desire to become a priest and this was encouraged by his parents. He departed for Ireland upon graduating high school to begin his novitiate with the Order of Friars Minor in Ireland. He was then sent to Rome where he studied for six years.

== Priesthood ==
Doggett was ordained in Rome on 2 July 1933. He remained in Europe for a year, studying canon law at the Louvain University, Belgium. He returned to Australia in mid-1934, after being recalled to become master of students at St Paschal's College, Melbourne.

He quickly rose through the ranks of the order, holding various positions until he was chosen as the first Superior of the newly established Franciscan mission in New Guinea in 1946. He was accompanied by just six priests although by 1957, there were 25 priests, five brothers and eight sisters working in the region. Despite setting off from Sydney in November 1946, they didn't arrive in Aitape until 22 March 1947.

In 1949, four Franciscan Sisters of Mary arrived in the Aitape Mission, following a request from Doggett.

== Episcopate ==
On 15 May 1952, Doggett was made prefect of the newly erected Prefecture Apostolic of Aitape. On 11 November 1956 when it was elevated to a Vicariate Apostolic, he was appointed its vicar apostolic and Titular Bishop of Mundinitza. He was consecrated as a bishop on 26 February 1957 at Mary Immaculate Catholic Church, Waverley by Romolo Carboni.

In 1968, he helped to bring the Patrician Brothers to Papua New Guinea. He had been taught by the brothers at Holy Cross College, Ryde.

=== Second Vatican Council ===
Doggett participated in all four sessions of the Second Vatican Council. He would later critique its implementation though, particularly on liturgical issues. He said in 1996: "[it was] horrible, if we judge the debate on the liturgy as we have it today. Very few bishops would be proud to say they had a hand in it. Communion in the hand was never mentioned in the debate, neither was the word table (mensa) to take the place of altar, the place of sacrifice… In my opinion the debate on the liturgy has been hijacked. The Council was to reform, not to change completely."

== Retirement and death ==
On 7 June 1969, Doggett resigned as Bishop of Aitape citing ill-health. He had been in charge of Aitape for 17 years. He retired from ministry on 7 July 1976. He spent the remainder of his life residing with the Franciscan community in Waverley.

In his final years, he moved to Rooty Hill, residing at Our Lady of Consolation Nursing Home. He died on 17 September 2004 at Blacktown Hospital, Sydney. He was the last surviving of eight siblings.

Catholic Church titles
Preceded by –	Bishop of Aitape; 1966–1969	Succeeded by William Kevin Rowell
Preceded by –	Titular Bishop of Menefessi; 1969–1976	Succeeded by Frédéric Etsou-Nzabi-Bamungwabi CICM
Preceded by Alfred Aimé Léon Marie CSSp	Titular Bishop of Mundinitza; 1956–1966	Succeeded by –
