= Meloram =

- village
- Location in Kerala, India Meloram (India)
- Coordinates: 9°34′22″N 76°56′11″E
- Country: India
- State: Kerala
- District: Idukki

Languages
  - Official: Malayalam, English
- Time zone: UTC+5:30 (IST)

Meloram is a village in Idukki district in India's southwestern state of Kerala.

== Notable people ==
- Siby Mathew Peedikayil: (1970) catholic bishop for the Roman Catholic Diocese of Aitape
