= Patrick Taval =

Roman Catholic of Papua New Guinea

Patrick Taval M.S.C.
- Bishop of Kerema
- Church: Catholic Church
- Diocese: Diocese of Kerema
- In office: 13 March 2010 – 29 April 2013
- Predecessor: Paul John Marx
- Successor: Pedro Centeno Baquero
- Previous posts: Coadjutor Bishop of Kerema (2007-2010); Titular Bishop of Thimida (1999-2007); Auxiliary Bishop of Rabaul (1999-2007)

Orders
- Ordination: 8 January 1984
- Consecration: 2 October 1999 by Karl Hesse

Personal details
- Born: 4 May 1956 Taranga (southwest of Rabaul), Territory of New Guinea, Territory of Papua and New Guinea, Australia, British Empire
- Died: 29 April 2013 (aged 56)

Patrick Taval (May 4, 1956 – April 29, 2013) was the Roman Catholic bishop of the Diocese of Kerema, Papua New Guinea.

Ordained to the priesthood in 1984, Taval was named Auxiliary Bishop of Rabaul, Papua New Guinea, and Titular Bishop of Thimida in 1999. He became Coadjutor Bishop of Kerema, Papua New Guinea, in March 2010 and then Bishop of Kerema in 2013.

Taval died in 2013 while in office.
