= Oglet-Khefifa =

Oglet Khefifa is a locality in Sfax Governorate southern Tunisia, located in the semi arid area south of Sfax.

Ruins at Oglet Khefifa have previously been identified with Macomades now thought to be a little further to the north, at Henchir el Ghorib.

An interpretation of the text of the life of St. Fulgence makes identification with the remains of ancient Bennefa more probable.
