= Virgil Patrick Copas =

Virgil Patrick Copas MSC
- (Arch)Bishop of Kerema
- Church: Catholic Church
- Diocese: Diocese of Kerema
- In office: 24 May 1976 – 6 December 1988
- Predecessor: Diocese erected
- Successor: Paul John Marx
- Previous posts: Archbishop of Port Moresby (1966-1975); Titular Bishop of Bennefa (1959-1966); Vicar Apostolic of Port Moresby (1959-1966)

Orders
- Ordination: 23 July 1944
- Consecration: 27 April 1960 by James Duhig

Personal details
- Born: 19 March 1915 Toowoomba, Queensland, Australia, British Empire
- Died: 3 October 1993 (aged 78)
- Motto: Ut cognoscant Te ("That they may know Thee")

Archbishop Sir Virgil Patrick Copas, KBE MSC (19 March 1915 – 3 October 1993) was archbishop of Kerema and Port Moresby, both in Papua New Guinea.

== Biography ==
Copas was born in Toowoomba, Queensland, and was educated at St. Mary's College and Downlands College. On 23 July 1944, aged 29, he was ordained as Priest of the Order of Missionaries of the Sacred Heart of Jesus by Archbishop Daniel Mannix. Copas studied anthropology and tropical medicine at Sydney University in preparation for missionary work in Papua New Guinea, where he was based at Vunapope, from 1946 to 1951, and also served as a military chaplain from 1945 to 1948. From 1952 to 1954 he was based at Samarai, and then was superior of the Sacred Heart missionaries in the Northern Territory from 1953 to 1960, also serving as a Naval Reserve chaplain, and as chaplain to the leprosarium.

On 19 December 1959 he was appointed Vicar Apostolic of Port Moresby, Papua New Guinea, and on 15 November 1966 he was appointed Archbishop of Port Moresby. On 19 December 1975, aged 60, he resigned as Archbishop of Port Moresby, but was appointed Archbishop (Personal Title) of Kerema, Papua New Guinea six months later. He resigned this position on 6 December 1988, and died in 1993, aged 78. He was a priest for 49 years and a bishop for 33 years.

Alastair McIntosh, who was a Scottish VSO volunteer (1977–80) in St Peter's Extension School which he established at Kerema, records this (presently unpublished) memory of him:

"My boss while I was there was Archbishop Virgil Copas. He'd retired from the capital city and had been proud to hand over to the first black archbishop. But instead of going back to Australia he chose to take up an unpopular posting in Gulf Province, one of the poorest parts of the country – a vast malaria swamp fringed with densely forested mountains to the north. He was known as the White Ghost as his lavish crop of white hair and his tall statue was well known.

"During my first year, teaching in his school for no-hope kids, I became ever so close to him. He talked only when necessary, and people would complain about having gone for tea with the bishop "but he said nothing." The truth was that he substituted words for presence and example. Maybe that was just as well because theologically he was conservative. His so-called "archiepiscopal palace" – a house made of asbestos-cement boarding – became a dormitory every night for homeless youth. You'd have to step over their bodies on the floor if you paid him a late visit. He simply lived for and with the poor. When people would steal from him, as they sometimes did, he'd say, "I hope they needed it more than we did." I saw some people despise him for that kind of attitude. They thought him politically naïve and a bit of an impractical joke. I just saw love, and from time to time I still feel that love as a mentoring hand, even years after his passing."

At an old age, Archbishop Copas continued to help the PNG people by bringing them to Queensland, Australia for important surgeries they wouldn't have been able to get otherwise. He was noted for his gentle nature and general popularity among those who knew him.

He was appointed a Knight Commander of the Order of the British Empire (KBE) in 1982.
