= Joseph Durero =

Roman Catholic bishop in Papua New Guinea

His Excellency, The Most Reverend Joseph Tarife Durero
- Bishop-elect of Daru-Kiunga
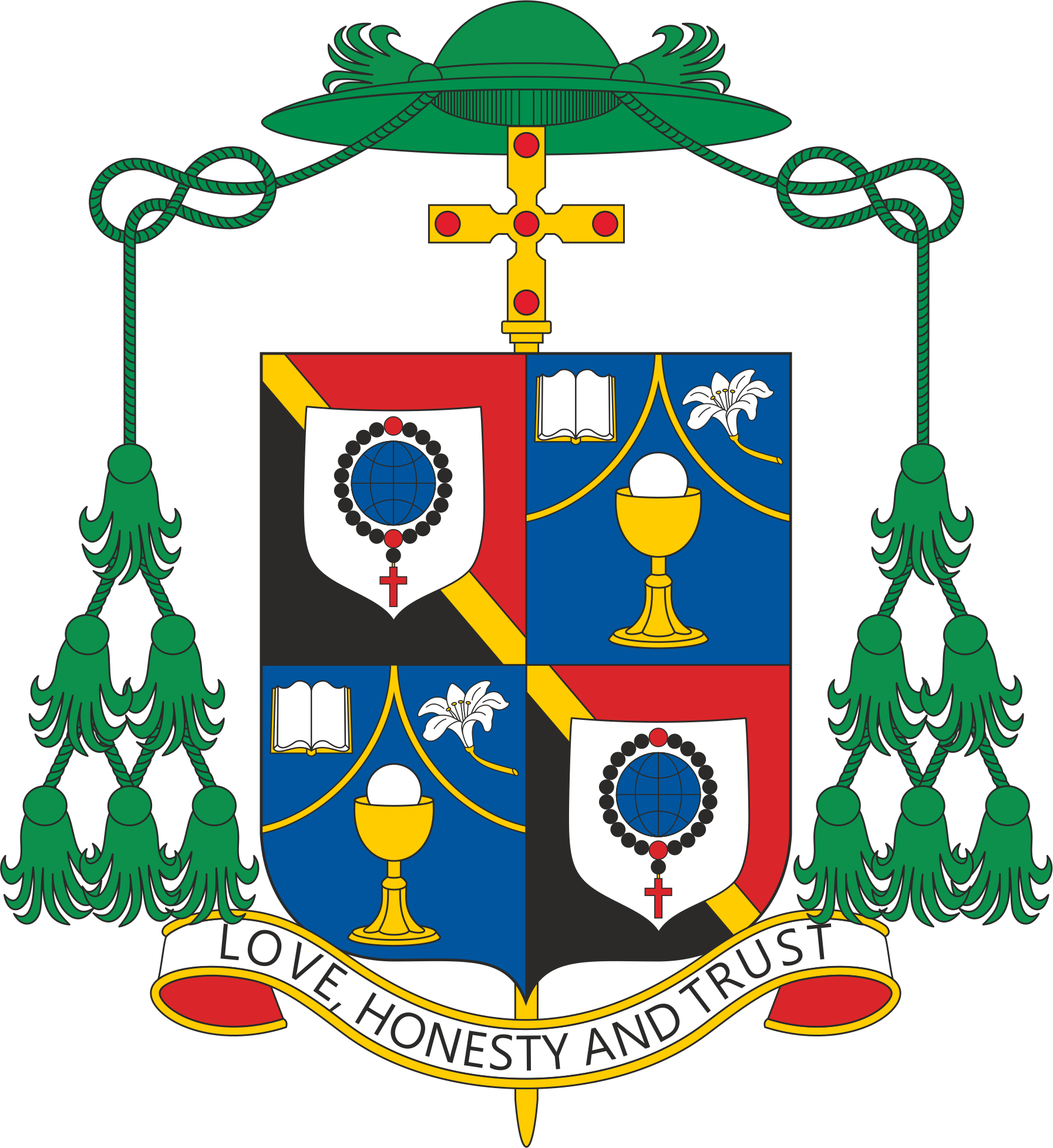
- Diocese: Daru-Kiunga
- Appointed: May 23, 2021
- Installed: TBA
- Predecessor: Gilles Côté
- Other posts: Administrator, Madang Cathedral

Orders
- Ordination: December 12, 1995

Personal details
- Born: April 13, 1968 (age 58) Dapa, Philippines

Styles of Joseph Tarife Durero
- Reference style: His Excellency; The Most Reverend
- Spoken style: Your Excellency
- Religious style: Bishop

Joseph Tarife Durero (born in 1968 in Dapa) is a Philippine-born clergyman and bishop-elect for the Roman Catholic Diocese of Daru-Kiunga in Papua New Guinea. He was appointed bishop in May 2021 and will succeed Canadian Gilles Côté who vacated the post in November 2020.
