= Eugène Klein =

French Roman Catholic bishop

Eugène Klein MSC
- Archbishop of Nouméa
- Church: Catholic Church
- Archdiocese: Archdiocese of Nouméa
- In office: 7 April 1972 – 19 June 1981
- Predecessor: Pierre-Paul-Émile Martin
- Successor: Michel-Marie Calvet
- Previous posts: Titular Archbishop of Velebusdus (1971-1972); Coadjutor Archbishop of Nouméa (1971-1972); Bishop of Bereina (1966-1971); Titular Bishop of Echinus (1960-1966); Vicar Apostolic of Yule Island (1960-1966)

Orders
- Ordination: 16 May 1943
- Consecration: 25 September 1960 by Joseph-Charles Lefèbvre

Personal details
- Born: 28 February 1916 Avenheim, Alsace–Lorraine, German Empire
- Died: 6 December 1992 (aged 76) Strasbourg, Bas-Rhin, France

Eugène Klein (1916 – 1992, born in Avenheim) was a French Catholic priest and member of the congregation of the Missionaries of the Sacred Heart.

He was appointed a bishop of the Vicariate Apostolic of Yule Island in Papua New Guinea in 1960 and the diocesan bishop when the territory became the Roman Catholic Diocese of Bereina in 1966.

In 1971 he was appointed Coadjutor Archbishop of the Archdiocese of Nouméa in New Caledonia, where he succeeded as Archbishop on 7 April 1972, serving until his resignation was accepted on 19 June 1981. He died in 1992.
