= Diocese of Bereina =

Latin Catholic diocese in Papua New Guinea

Coordinates: 8.6278°S 146.5480°E

Diocese of Bereina Dioecesis Bereinitana
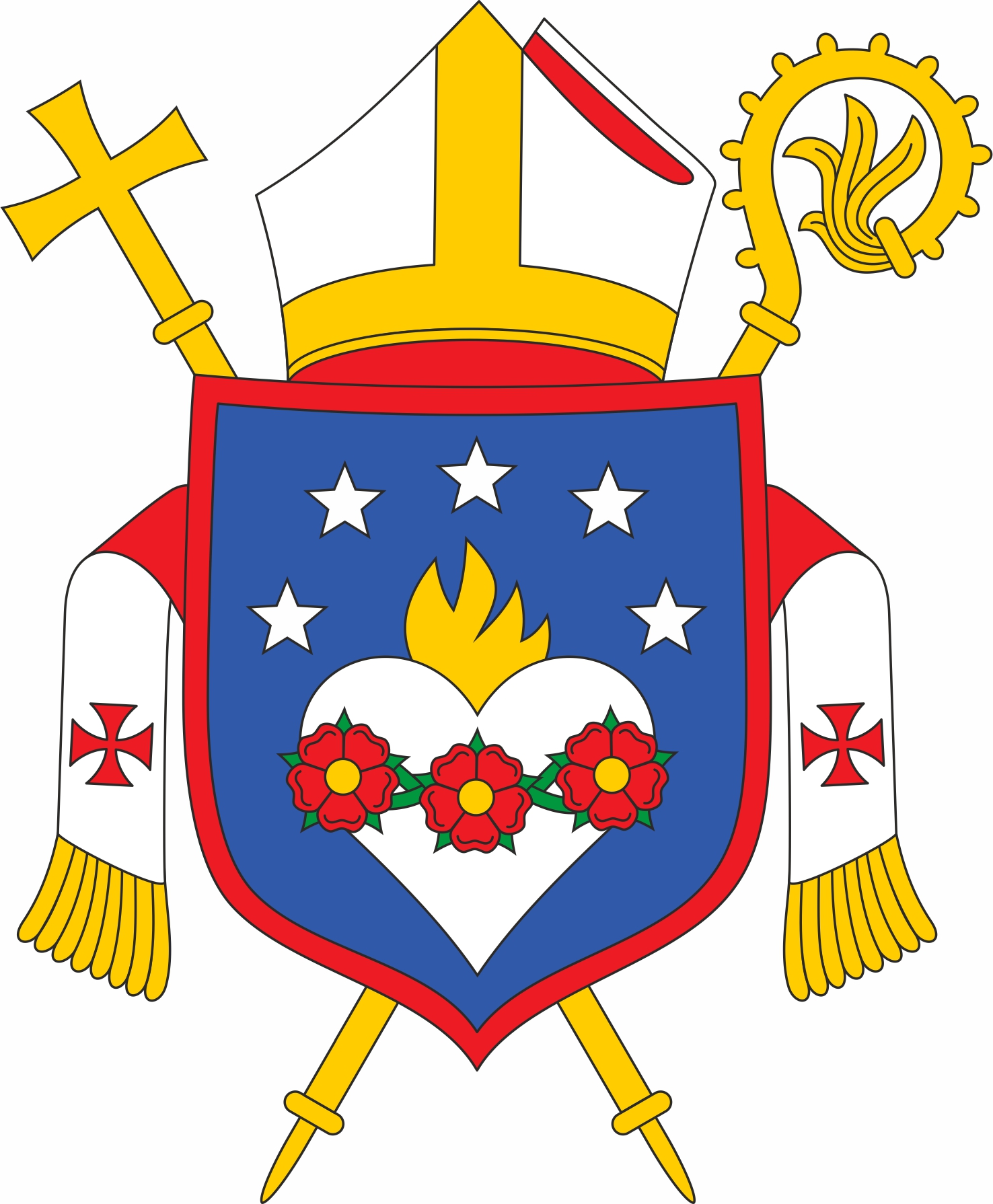
- Coat of arms

Location
- Country: Papua New Guinea
- Ecclesiastical region: Archdiocese of Port Moresby

Statistics
- Area: 20,146 km^{2} (7,778 sq mi)
- Population: Total; Catholics: (as of 2023); 147,200; 100,360 (68.2%)
- Parishes: 15

Information
- Denomination: Catholic Church
- Sui iuris church: Latin Church
- Rite: Roman Rite
- Established: 16 July 1959; 66 years ago

Current leadership
- Pope: Leo XIV
- Bishop: Otto Separy
- Metropolitan Archbishop: John Ribat, M.S.C.

The Diocese of Bereina is a Latin Catholic suffragan diocese of the Archdiocese of Port Moresby. It was erected as a Vicariate Apostolic in 1959 and elevated to a diocese in 1966.

== Bishops ==
=== Ordinaries ===
- Eugène Klein, M.S.C. (1960–1971), appointed Coadjutor Archbishop of Nouméa, New Caledonia
- Louis Vangeke, M.S.C. (1976–1979)
- Benedict To Varpin (1979–1987), appointed Coadjutor Archbishop of Madang
- Luke Paul Matlatarea, M.S.C. (1988–1998)
- Gérard-Joseph Deschamps, S.M.M. (1999–2002)
- John Ribat, M.S.C. (2002–2007), appointed Coadjutor Archbishop of Port Moresby; future Cardinal
- Rochus Tatamai, M.S.C. (2007–2018), appointed Bishop of Kavieng
- Otto Separy (2019–present)

=== Auxiliary bishop ===
- John Ribat, M.S.C. (2000–2002), appointed Bishop here; future Cardinal

== External links and references ==
- "Diocese of Bereina". Catholic-Hierarchy.
