= Otto Separy =

- Bishop of Bereina
- Church: Catholic Church
- Diocese: Diocese of Bereina
- Appointed: 16 July 2019
- Predecessor: Rochus Tatamai
- Previous posts: Bishop of Aitape (2009-2019); Titular Bishop of Pupiana (2007-2009); Auxiliary Bishop of Aitape (2007-2009)

Orders
- Ordination: 17 June 1991
- Consecration: 30 October 2007 by Austen Robin Crapp

Personal details
- Born: 5 August 1957 (age 68)
- Coat of arms

Otto Separy (born 5 August 1957 in Kubila) is a Papua New Guinean clergyman and bishop for the Roman Catholic Diocese of Aitape. He was appointed bishop in 2009. He left for Bereina in 2019.

He is the president of the Catholic Bishops Conference of Papua New Guinea and Solomon Islands.

== See also ==
- Catholic Church in Papua New Guinea
