= Mary Immaculate Catholic Church, Waverley =

Mary Immaculate Church
- Church of Mary Immaculate
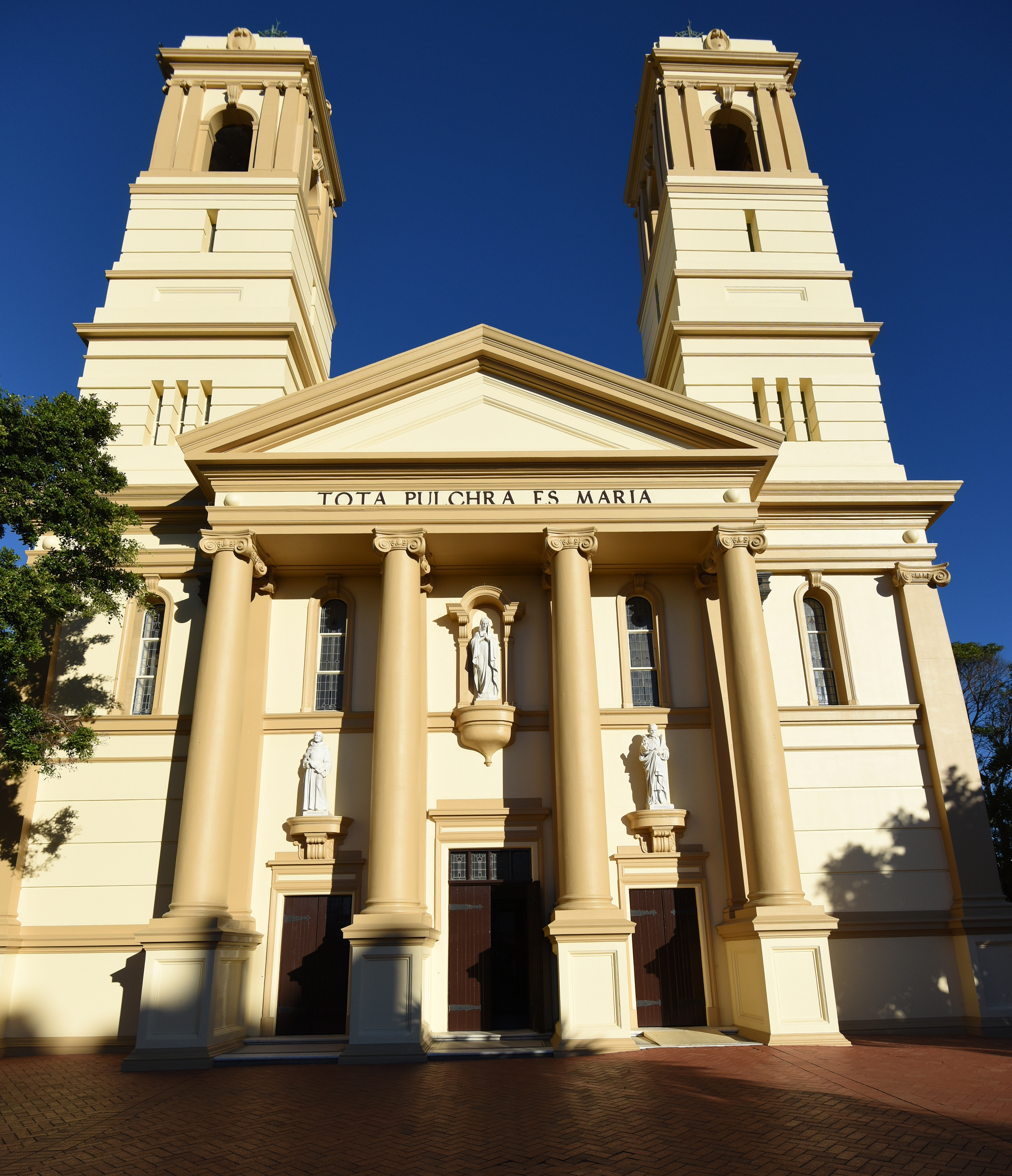
- Mary Immaculate Catholic Church, in 2017

- Location in Greater Sydney
- 33°54′03″S 151°15′18″E
- Location: 45 Victoria Street, Waverley, New South Wales
- Country: Australia
- Denomination: Roman Catholic
- Religious order: Franciscan Order
- Website: www.waverleycatholic.org.au

History
- Status: Basilica
- Dedication: Mary Immaculate
- Dedicated: 31 August 1913 by Archbishop Michael Kelly

Architecture
- Functional status: Active
- Architect(s): Sheerin & Hennessy
- Architectural type: Church
- Style: Victorian Renaissance Revival; Federation Academic Classical
- Years built: 1890–1929

Specifications
- Capacity: 400 worshippers

Administration
- Archdiocese: Sydney
- Parish: Saint Charles Borromeo

New South Wales Heritage Register
- Official name: Mary Immaculate Group; St Charles Borromeo Church; Parish House and Minamurra Cottage (former)
- Type: State heritage (complex / group)
- Designated: 2 April 1999
- Reference no.: 626
- Type: Church
- Category: Religion
- Builders: John Ptolomy; W. J. Bolton (1929)

Mary Immaculate Church is a heritage-listed Roman Catholic church and friary at 45 Victoria Street, Waverley, Sydney, New South Wales, Australia. It was designed by Sheerin & Hennessy and built from 1890 to 1929 by John Ptolomy and by W. J. Bolton (1929). It is also known as Mary Immaculate Group, St Charles Borromeo Church and Parish House and Minamurra Cottage (former). The property is owned by the Association of Franciscan Friars Bros. It was added to the New South Wales State Heritage Register on 2 April 1999.

== History ==
=== Waverley ===
Waverley took its name from the title of a book by the famous Scottish author and poet, Sir Walter Scott. Its connection with the suburb of Waverley comes through Barnett Levey (or Levy, 1798-1837) who came to Sydney in the 1820s to visit his brother. When he saw how prosperous the city was becoming, Levey decided to settle here and set up a business as a general merchant. In 1831 he was granted 24 hectares (60 acres) in the area bounded by the present Old South Head Road, Birrell Street, Paul Street and Hollywood Avenue. He must have occupied the land before the official grant because he built himself a substantial two-story home on Old South Head Road in 1827, naming it Waverley House after the book by his favourite author. As time passed the house became a distinctive landmark and gave its name to the surrounding district, which was simply called Waverley. Levey established Sydney's first permanent theatre behind his shop in George Street. His projects consumed all his money, and when he died in 1837 he left a widow and four children in poverty. In 1837 the house was taken over for a Catholic school or orphanage, but it was demolished early in the 20th century.

Waverley municipality was proclaimed in 1859. By the 1880s trams were running to the beaches in the Eastern Suburbs and Waverley became a popular picnic spot. Waverley Park had an oval, used by Waverley District Cricket Club.

Waverley Cemetery was established in 1877 on the site of the old tram terminus, on a beautiful site near the ocean. It houses many historically notable people.

The 1866 NSW Gazetteer described Waverley as having Clough's Windmill, Allan's Soap Works, Dickson's Soap and Candle Works and Scott's Blacking and Fireworks Factory. There were also four quarries producing excellent freestone. Today however, it is an attractive residential suburb, just west of Tamarama Beach.

=== Mary Immaculate Group ===
The first Catholic Church was built in 1854 on the site of the nearby St Charles School. Later churches were built on the same site in 1866 and 1902.

In 1879 the Franciscan Order of Friars took over the work of the Waverley Parish. In 1891 they built their Friary on this site, which had been gifted to the Order. The Friars initially conducted church services in various churches constructed on the nearby St. Charles School site, however as these no longer catered for the growing Catholic population a new church was built adjacent to the Friary in 1912. The church originally had Romanesque features designed by architectural firm, Sheerin and Hennessy and built by John Ptolomy. In 1928-9 the church had a major Classical remodelling undertaken to the design of Hennessy and Hennessy, with W. J. Bolton the builder. In 1928-9 the Friary was also extended with new Juniorette College constructed at its rear. A grotto was also built between the church and the Friary around this time.

One of the Fathers planted the (now large) Hill's fig tree and other plantings in c. 1937. Aerial photographs from the 1930s and 1943 show the buildings, but also the surrounding garden, wall and trees along the Victoria Street frontage.

The Juniorette was relocated to Robertson in 1946, however the old building continued to be a focus of the Order until the late 1980s when the original Friary was demolished following a fire, and the current Friary built in its place. It is assumed that the brick driveway extending from the street and some landscaping and planting between the buildings were added at this time. Part of the site has also been sold and the area around the site developed as a nursing home. The church, associated wall and garden remain as prominent landmarks in the area.

== Description ==
The Mary Immaculate Group comprises Mary Immaculate and St Charles Borromeo Church; the former Parish House; and "Minnamurra" cottage.

Other structures on site include the Juniorette College; Grotto; Perimeter (Victoria Street) sandstone block boundary retaining wall; and Friary (1891, demolished).

=== Setting ===
The group is located on a one-hectare (three-acre) site on the southern side of Victoria Street, east of the intersection of Bronte Road and Carrington Road. Its eastern portion is bounded (on its northern side) by a high sandstone block wall. A raised garden bed and landscaped garden is located behind the wall, with a number of mature trees and plantings. The most notable is a mature Hill's fig (Ficus microcarpa var. Hillii) located close to the wall's western end near the driveway to the church. One of the Fathers planted the large Hill's fig (Ficus microcarpa var. Hillii) and other plantings in c. 1937. Aerial photos dating from the 1930s and 1943 show the buildings and surrounding garden, wall and trees along the Victoria Street frontage.

=== Structures ===
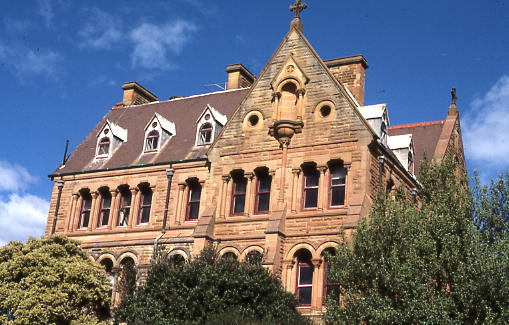
The Gothic Revival Friary in 2007, prior to its demolition.

1. Mary Immaculate and St. Charles Borromeo Church (1912, front facade remodelled in the 1920s). Large basilica in the Victorian Renaissance Revival style with Classical Revival facade to the lower part of building. The clerestorey level, with its two imposing bell towers, appears to be in a different style. The entrance is formed by a large, pedimented portico with four, imposing Ionic columns. Ionic pilasters continue around to the sides. There are interior niches at the front with statues. The twin towers are square with horizontal rendered bands (LEP, expanded slightly). A landmark church building and an important element in the historic Charing Cross townscape. Facade is considered a fine example of a 1920s Federation Academic Classical remodelling (Recorded in Identifying Australian Architecture as an illustrative example of the style). An example of the work of noted architects, Sheerin and Hennessy. Local, historical and social interest, particularly to the local Catholic community. Modern buildings adjoining are reasonably sympathetic (LEP).
2. Sandstone Block Wall along Victoria Street (c. 1891).
3. Friary (1891; extended in 1928/9 with the Juniorette College). A large three storey building with an attic and basement and Gothic Revival style detailing.
4. Juniorette College (1928/9) built at the rear of the Friary.
5. Grotto (c. 1928-9) between the church and the Friary.

=== Modifications and dates ===
The following modifications have been made to the site and buildings:

- 1912 – church; 1929 facade remodelling.
- c. 1935 – planted fig tree and other plantings.
- Late 1980s – original Friary was demolished following a fire, and the current Friary built in its place. It is assumed that the brick driveway extending from the street and some landscaping and planting between the buildings were added at this time.

== Heritage listing ==
As at 30 October 2007, the Mary Immaculate Group is of State significance. It includes the buildings known as Mary Immaculate and St Charles Borromeo Church, the former Parish House and Minnamurra Cottage.

Mary Immaculate was listed on the New South Wales State Heritage Register on 2 April 1999.

== See also ==
- Roman Catholicism in Australia
