= Leo Arkfeld =

Leo Arkfeld SVD
- Archbishop of Madang
- Church: Catholic Church
- Archdiocese: Archdiocese of Madang
- In office: December 19, 1975 – December 31, 1987
- Predecessor: Adolph Alexander Noser
- Successor: Benedict To Varpin
- Previous posts: Apostolic Administrator of Wewak (1975-1987); Bishop of Wewak (1966-1987); Vicar Apostolic of Wewak (1952-1966); Titular Bishop of Bucellus (1948-1966); Vicar Apostolic of Central New Guinea (1948-1952)

Orders
- Ordination: August 15, 1943 by William David O'Brien
- Consecration: November 30, 1948 by Samuel Stritch

Personal details
- Born: Leo Clement Andrew Arkfeld; February 4, 1912 Butte, Nebraska, United States
- Died: August 21, 1999 (aged 87)

Leo Clement Andrew Arkfeld (born in 1912 in Butte, Nebraska) was an American clergyman and bishop for the Roman Catholic Diocese of Wewak.

He was appointed bishop of Wewak in 1948, and Archbishop of Madang in 1975 until his retirement in 1987. He died in 1999.
