= Santissima Trinità dei Pellegrini, Rome =

Coordinates: 41°53′37″N 12°28′22″E

Santissima Trinità dei Pellegrini
- Most Holy Trinity of the Pilgrims
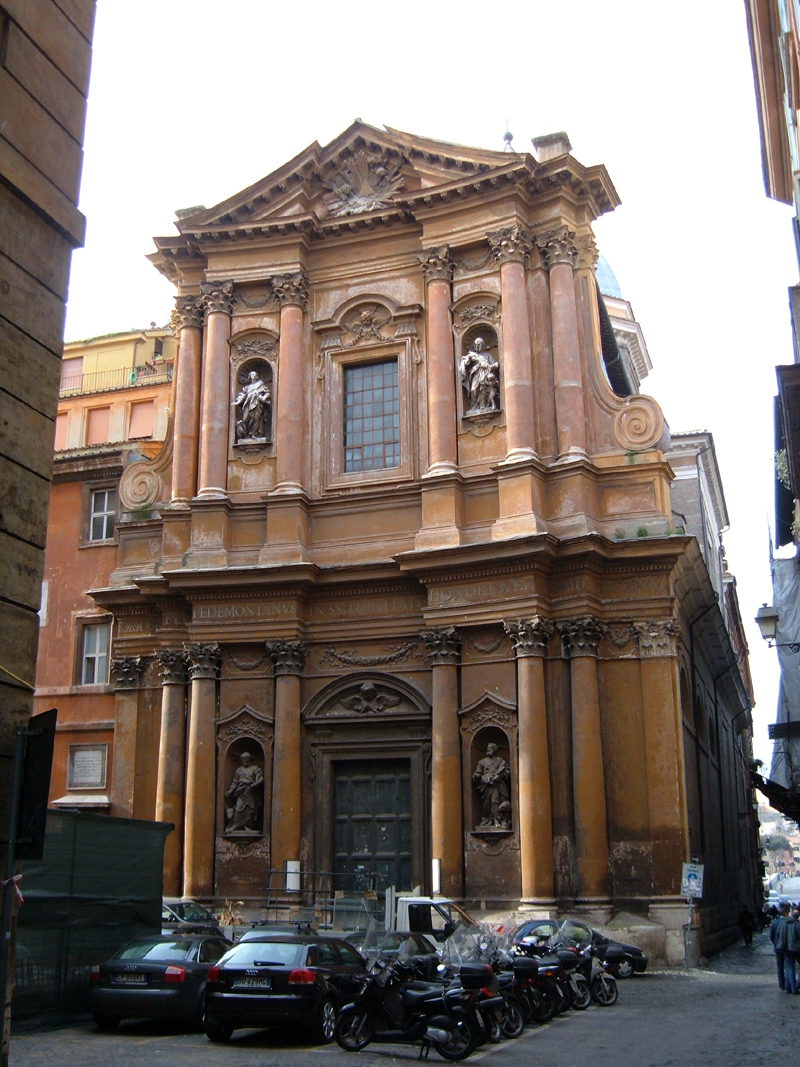
- Santissima Trinità dei Pellegrini
- Location: Regola, Rome
- Country: Italy
- Denomination: Catholic
- Tradition: Roman Rite
- Religious institute: Priestly Fraternity of Saint Peter
- Website: roma.fssp.it

History
- Status: Personal Parish
- Founded: 1540 (original parish); 2008 (new parish)
- Consecrated: 12 June 1616

Architecture
- Style: Baroque
- Years built: 1587-1616

Administration
- Province: Rome
- Diocese: Rome

Clergy
- Bishop: Pope Leo XIV
- Priest(s): Fr. Brice Meissonnier, FSSP

The Chiesa della Santissima Trinità dei Pellegrini (Church of the Most Holy Trinity of the Pilgrims) is a Roman Catholic church located on Via dei Pettinari #36 In the rione of Regola of central Rome, Italy. It stands a block away from the Palazzo Spada on Via Capo di Ferro, while a few blocks away on the Via dei Pettinari stands the Ponte Sisto.

== History ==
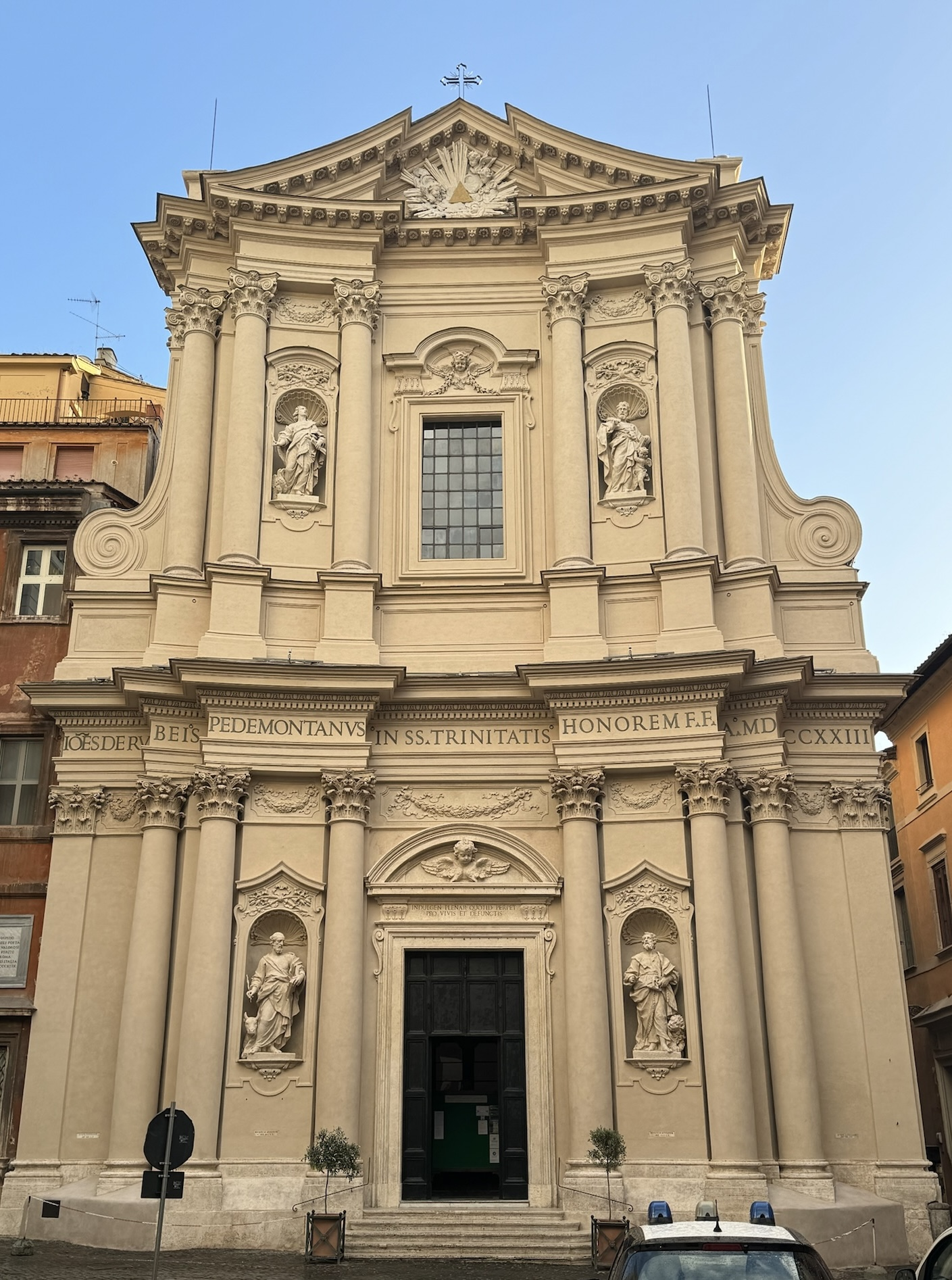
Façade after the 2024 restoration

Urged by Filippo Neri, by 1540 lay members of his order gathered at the church of San Girolamo della Carità. Neri soon had Pope Paul III recognise the group as the Confraternita della Santissima Trinita de' Pellegrini e de' Convalescenti (Fraternity of the Holy Trinity of Pilgrims and Convalescent). For the Jubilee of 1550, the group took on the burden of hosting pilgrims, with particular regard for those who came from distant lands. After Holy Year, the association cared for the convalescent poor, discharged from city hospitals. In 1558, Pope Paul IV assigned them the dilapidated church of San Benedetto in Arenula. The next year, the fraternity bought a house near the church to be used as a hospital-hospice. For the Jubilee of 1575, the fraternity hosted more than 180,000 pilgrims.

The fraternity ultimately razed the decrepit church, and the first stone for the present church was laid on February 26, 1587. The consecration took place on June 12, 1616 and the church was titled initially Santissima Trinità e San Benedetto. In subsequent centuries the parish and adjacent buildings continued to serve as a hospice for pilgrims, or as a hospital.

In 2008 Pope Benedict XVI entrusted the parish to the Priestly Fraternity of St. Peter (FSSP), a society of apostolic life dedicated to the celebration and preservation of the Tridentine Mass, the 1962 form of which is authorised, under certain conditions, for continued use within the Catholic Church. The SS Trinità dei Pellegrini church provides the Mass in this form for the local community, as well as for tourists and pilgrims.

As the home parish of the Latin Mass in Rome, Santissima Trinità hosts numerous visiting clergy who celebrate the Latin mass, including Archbishop Alexander King Sample of Portland in Oregon, Bishop Athanasius Schneider of Astana, Kazakhstan, and Raymond Cardinal Burke.

== Art and architecture ==
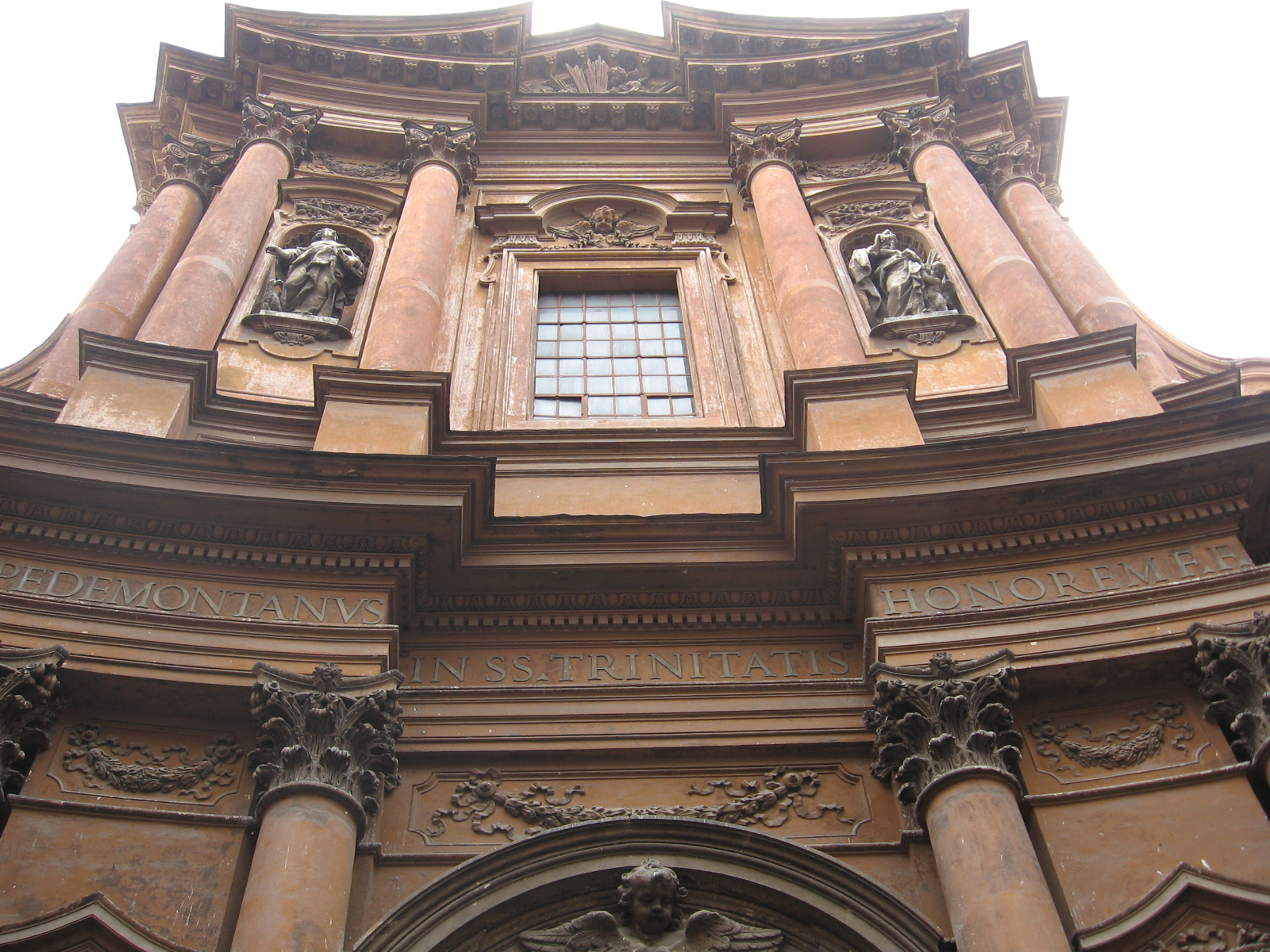
Façade before the 2024 restoration

=== Façade ===
In 1722, a Piedmontese merchant, Giovanni Battista de' Rossi, commissioned the architect Giuseppe Sardi to build the partially concave, late-Baroque style façade using designs by Francesco De Sanctis. The stucco statues on the façade, depicting the four evangelists, were completed by Bernardino Ludovisi. The adjacent building to the façade (left of the church when facing the façade) was the former hospice of the confraternity.

=== Interior ===
The church has a Latin cross design with eight chapels:

1. Chapel of Crocifisso
2. Chapel of San Filippo Neri: The altarpiece depicting the Ecstasy of St Phillip and vision of the Virgin and child (1853) was painted by Filippo Bigioli.
3. Chapel of Giovanni Battista de' Rossi: first dedicated to the Annunciation, and until recently, it housed the remains of this saint. It was frescoed by Giovanni Battista Ricci; The altarpieces by Antonio Bianchini depict Jesus and Saint and Phillip Neri crowns St Giovanni Battista de’Rossi.
4. Chapel of St Matthew: on right transept. The altar statue of Apostle Matthew was sculpted by Jacob Cornelisz Cobaert.
5. Chapel of the Madonna and Saints Joseph & Benedict: in left transept, now dedicated to Virgin of the Auxilium christianorum (Aide to Christians). The faint frescoes belong to the outer wall of the Palazzo Capranica: donated to the confraternity in 1558 by Pope Paul IV. The altarpiece, by Giambattista Ricci, and depict Saints Joseph and Benedict of Norcia.
6. Chapel of St Gregory the Great: The prior church at the site was dependent on the church of San Benedetto of the monastery of San Gregorio. The altarpiece depicts Pope Gregory I liberating souls from Purgatory painted by Baldassarre Croce; he also painted the frescoes on the walls.
7. Chapel of Saints Augustine and Francis of Assisi: The altarpiece depicting the Virgin with ST Francis and Augustine by Cavalier d'Arpino.
8. Chapel of St Charles Borromeo: The altarpiece depicting the Virgin and child and Saints Carlo Borromeo, Domenico di Guzmán, Phillip Neri, and Felice da Cantalice was painted by Guillaume Courtois, also called il Borgognone.

The transept and altar were designed by Martino Longhi il Vecchio and Giovanni Paolo Maggi. The nave frescoes were originally painted by Raffaele Ferrara in 1853. The cupola (1612) was designed by Giovanni Battista Contini and decorated in polychrome marble by Valadier. The pennants were frescoed with the Evangelists by Giovanni Battista Ricci; the cupola is frescoed with God the father, attributed to Reni.

The main altar has four columns of African black marble, and was built in 1616 by designs of Domenico Pozzi. The altarpiece depicts the Trinity (1625), a masterwork by Guido Reni. The work was commissioned by Cardinal Ludovico Ludovisi, nephew of Pope Gregory XV.

== See also ==
- 17th-century Western domes

=== Gallery ===
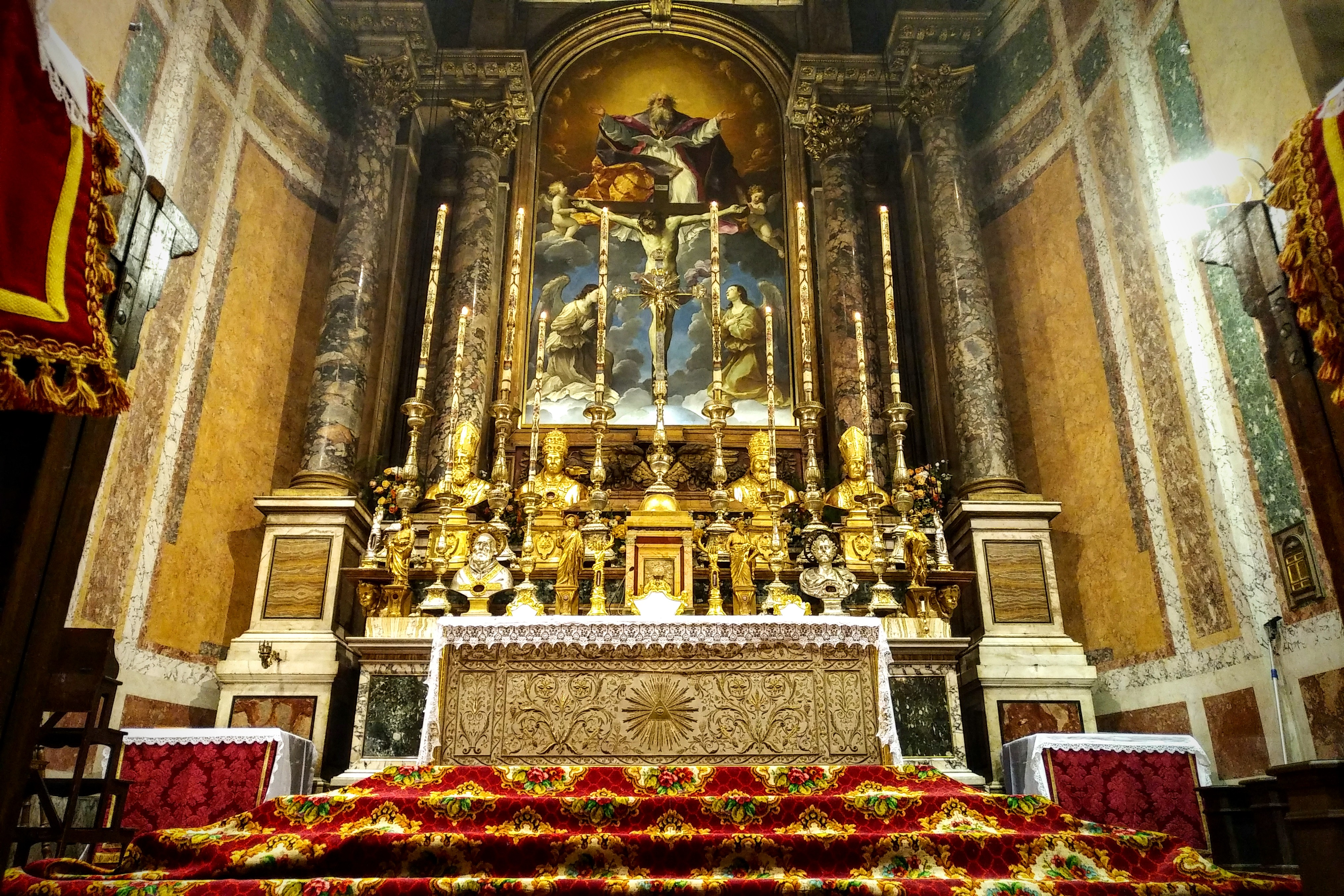
The High Altar at Trinità - Easter

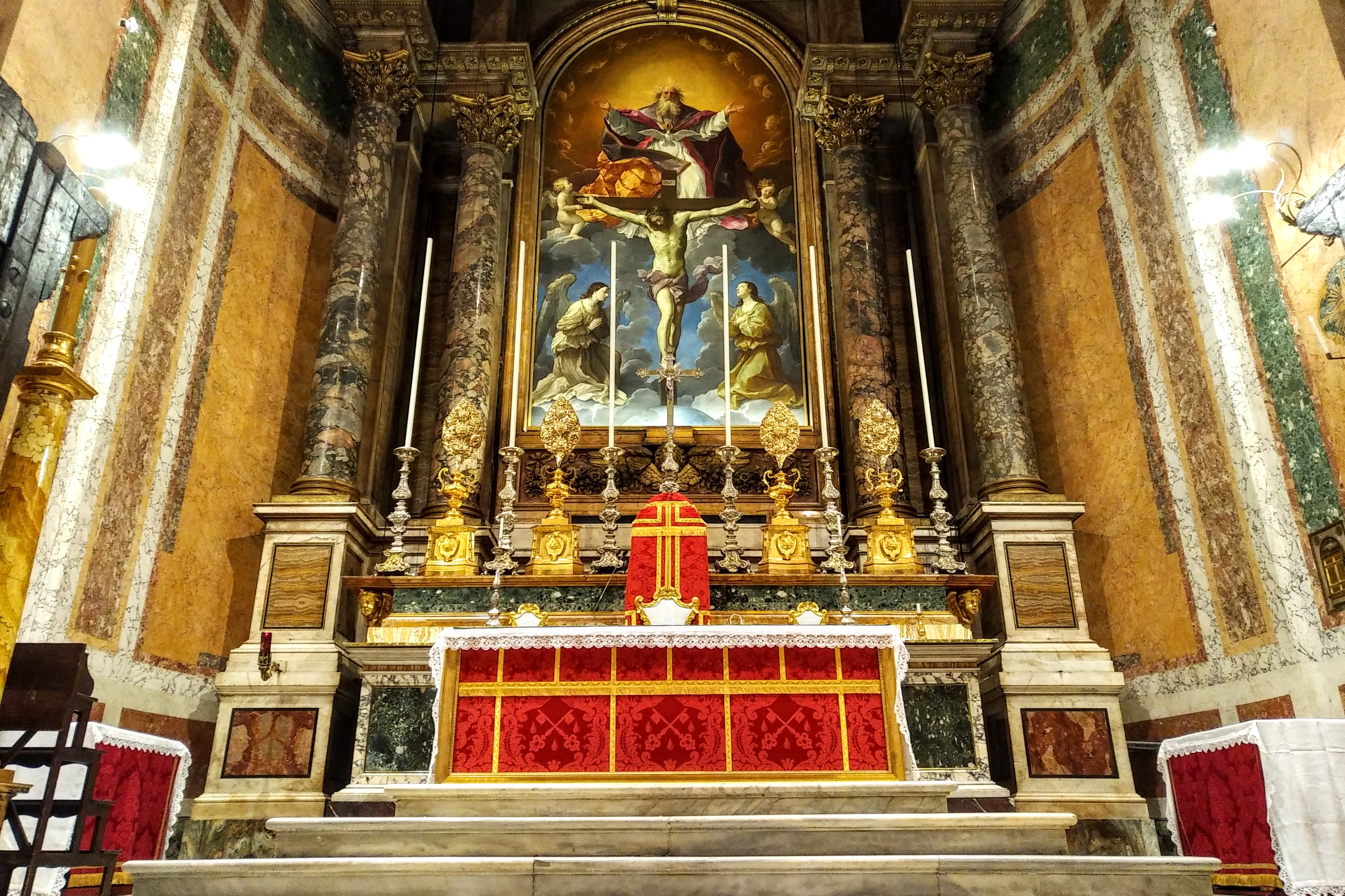
High Altar - Red

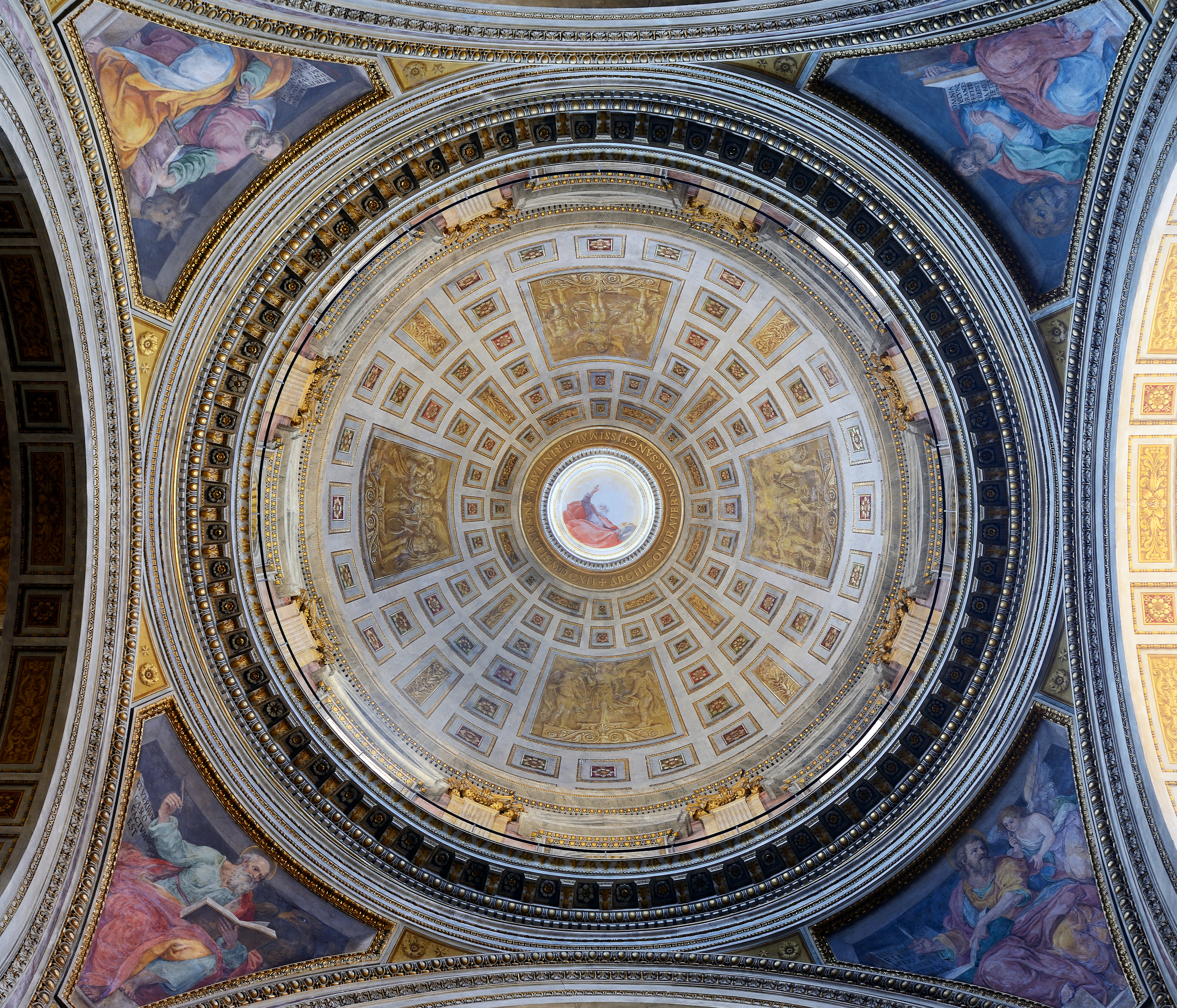
Cupola

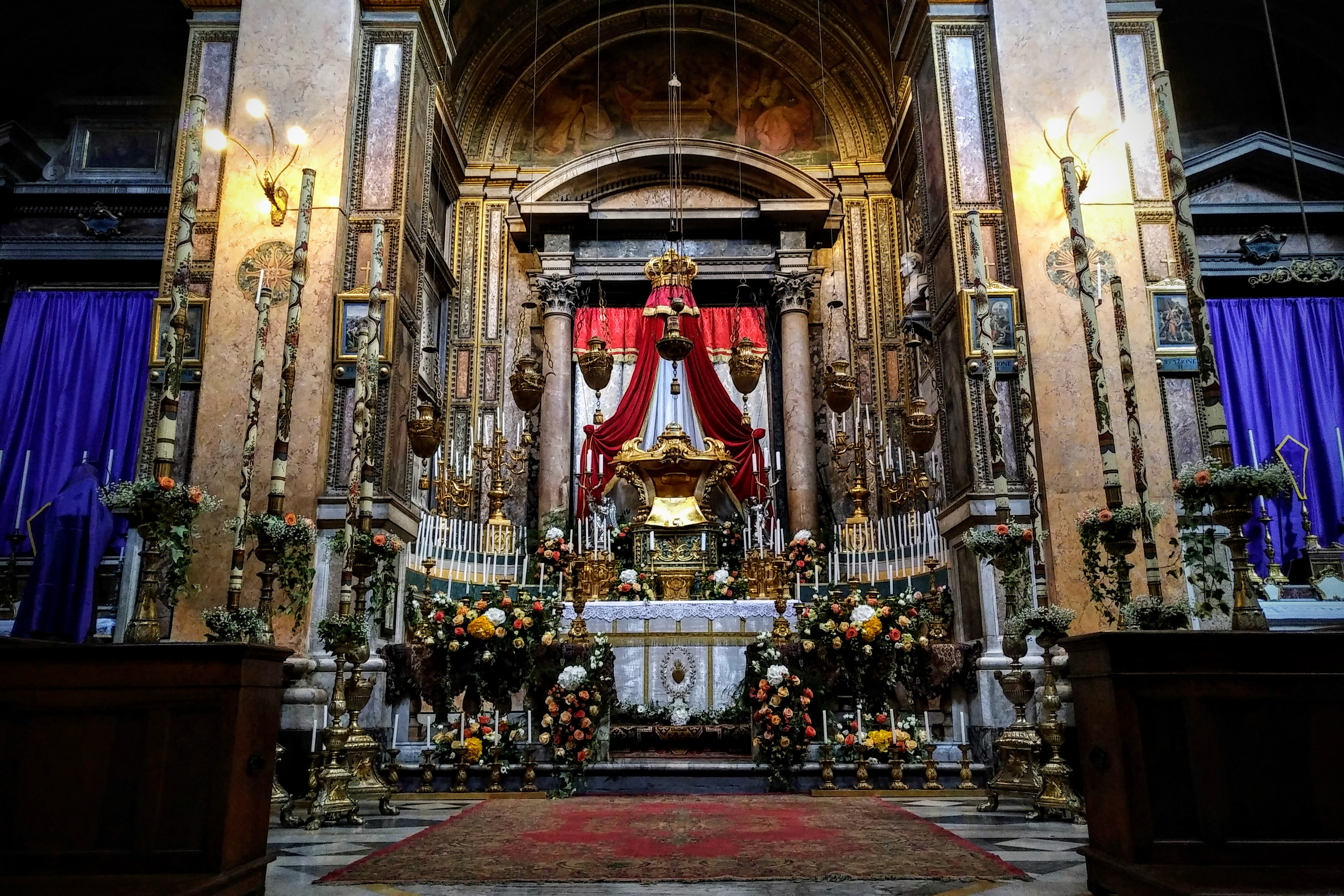
Altar of Repose - Holy Week 2019

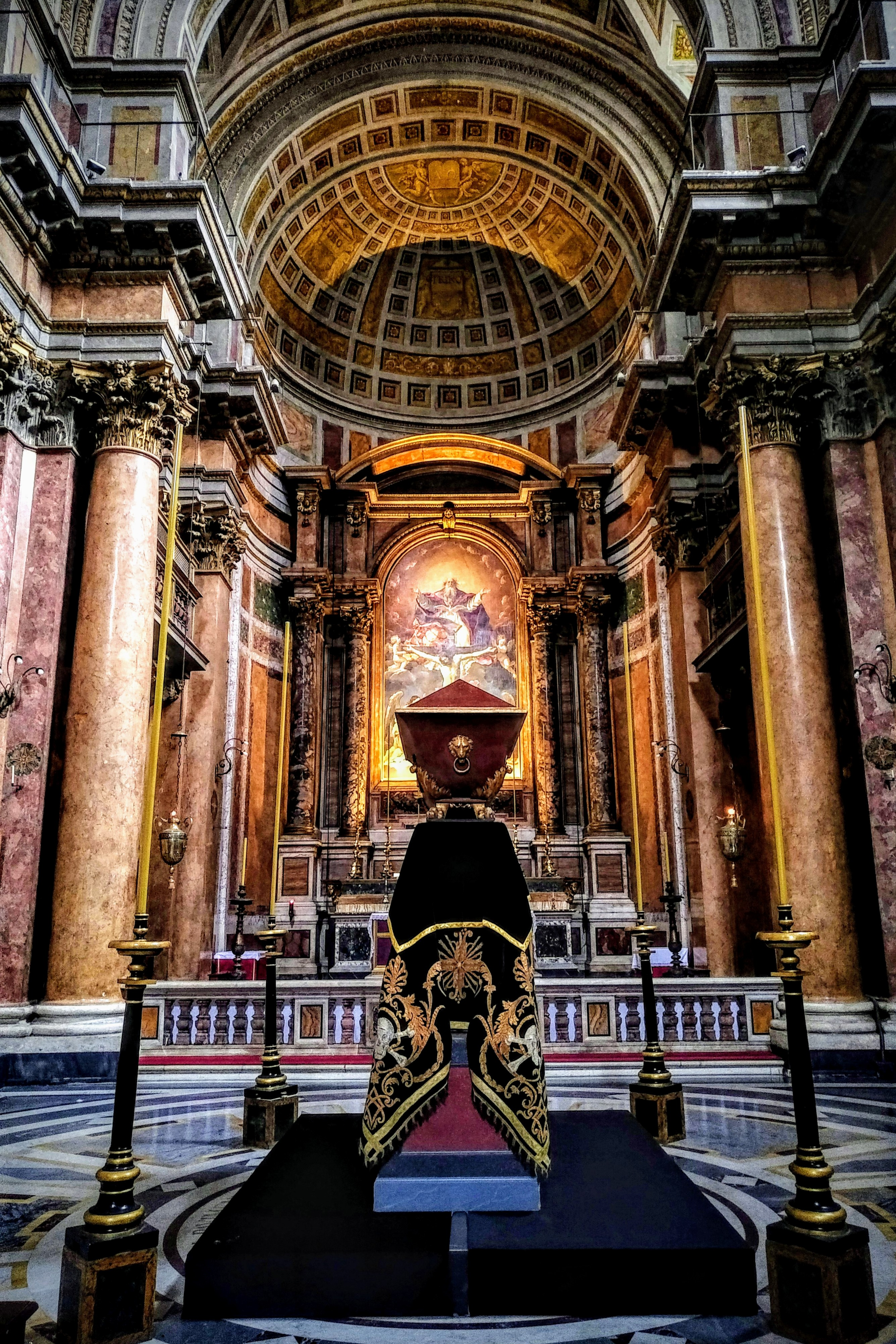
All Souls Day

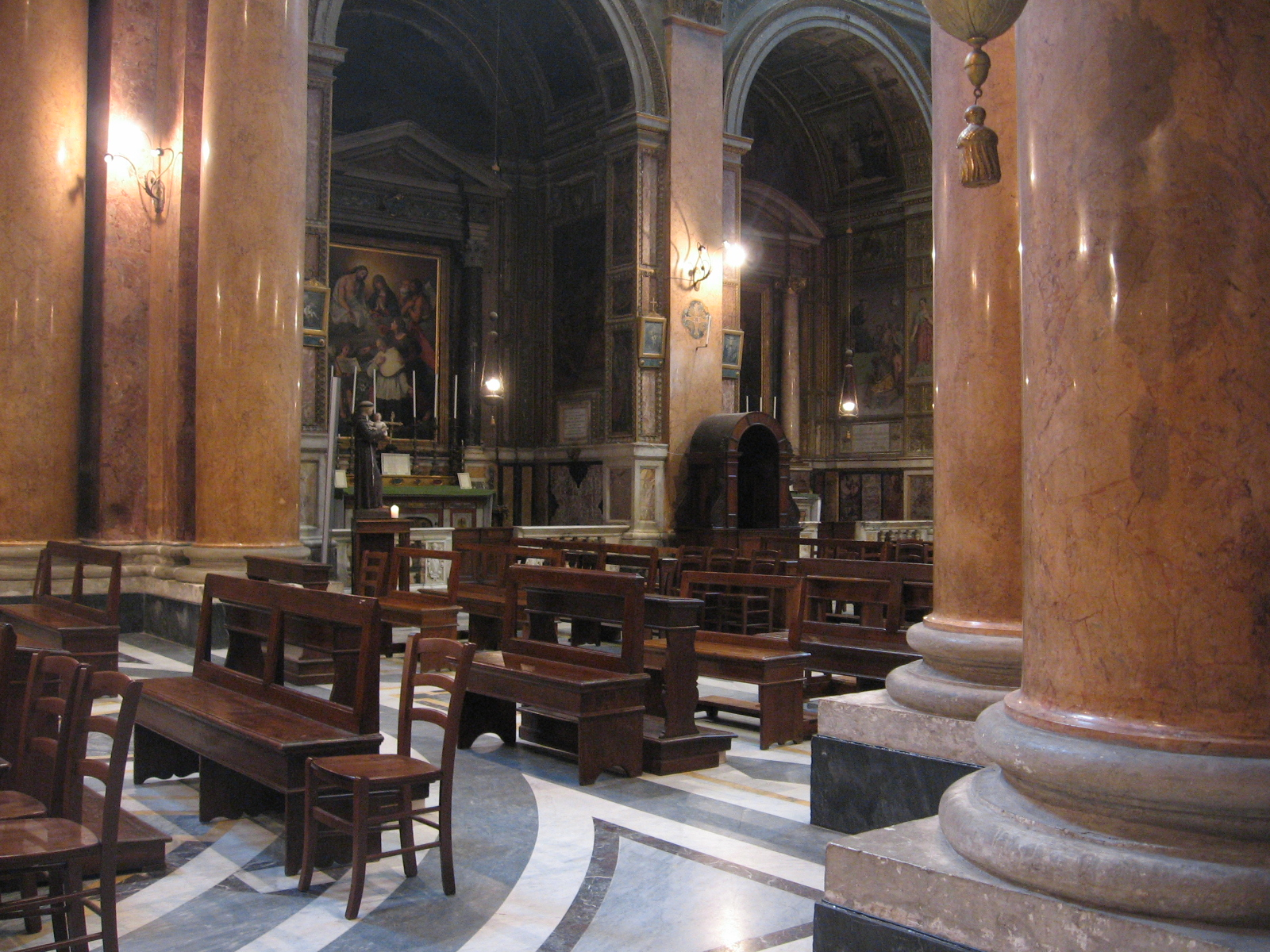
Nave

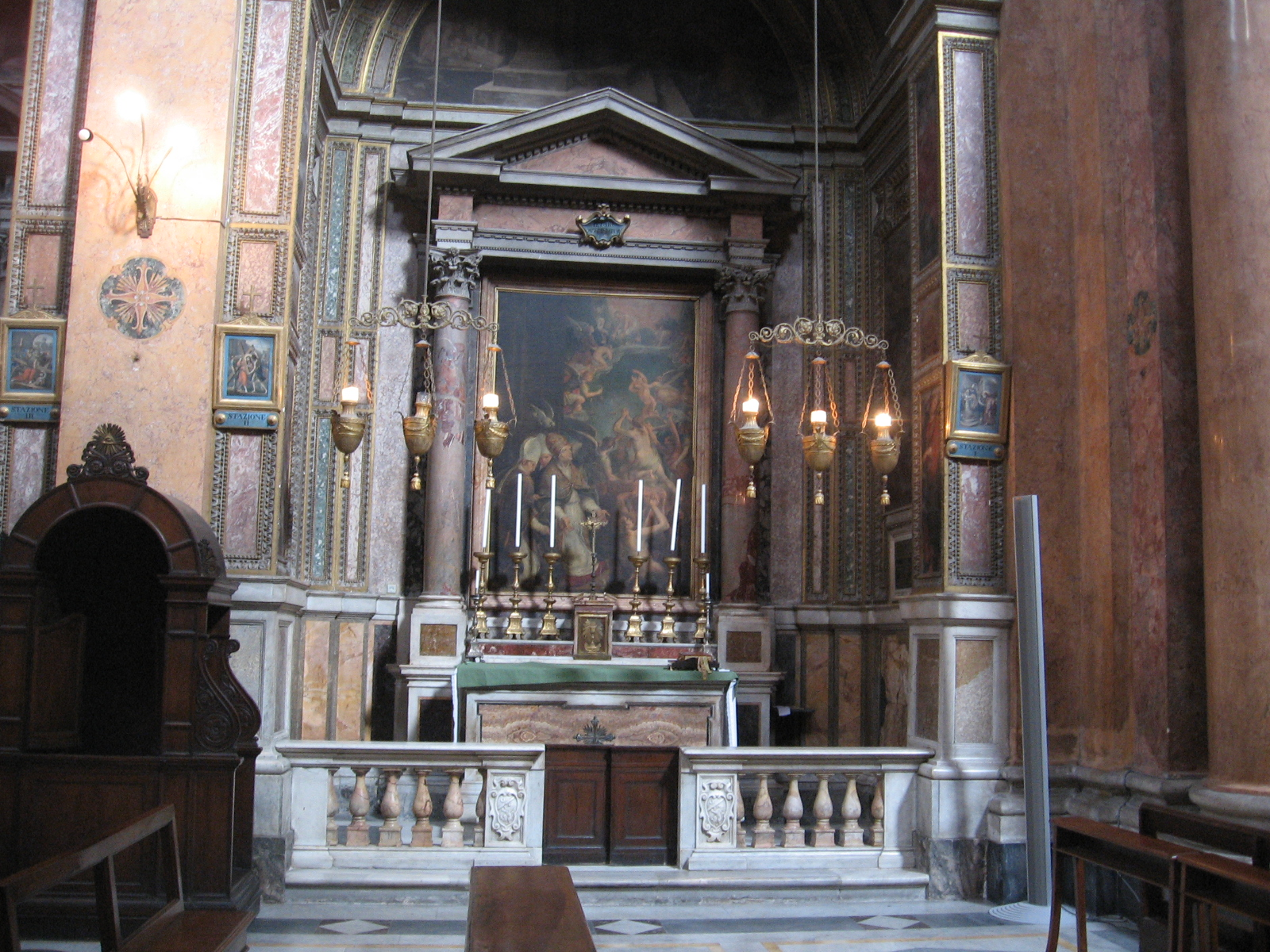
Altar of St Gregorio
