= Brian James Barnes =

Sir Brian James Barnes KBE GCL OFM
- Archbishop of Port Moresby
- Church: Catholic Church
- Archdiocese: Archdiocese of Port Moresby
- In office: 14 June 1997 – 26 March 2008
- Predecessor: Peter Kurongku
- Successor: John Ribat
- Previous post: Bishop of Aitape (1987-1997)

Orders
- Ordination: 12 July 1958
- Consecration: 10 February 1988 by Leo Arkfeld

Personal details
- Born: 23 March 1933 Wingham, New South Wales, Australia
- Died: 9 May 2017 (aged 84) Blacktown, Sydney, New South Wales, Australia

Sir Brian James Barnes, KBE, GCL (23 March 1933 – 9 May 2017) was a Roman Catholic archbishop.

== Early life ==
Barnes was born to Arthur Keith and Eileen Barnes in Wingham, on the Mid North Coast of New South Wales. His father worked for the Bank of New South Wales. His family were strong supporters of the local Church and Convent. When he was two, the family moved from Wingham to Tamworth. He had two brothers and a sister.

Barnes joined the Order of Friars Minor after leaving school and was professed as a member of the order on 18 February 1952.

== Priesthood ==
Barnes was ordained to the priesthood on 12 July 1958 and was appointed to Waverley.

In October 1959, he was appointed to the mission of Papua New Guinea. He served as assistant priest in Aitape before serving as headmaster at Seleo Island. He then served as parish priest to Monandin, Nuku, Wati, Ningil and Lumi between 1960 and 1968. In 1968, he was appointed chaplain to the Royal Papua New Guinea Constabulary, based in Port Moresby but requiring extensive travel throughout the country. He served in this role until 1988.

In 1976, Barnes became a citizen of Papua New Guinea, a sign of his dedication and loyalty to the country. In 1982, he was made a Member of the Order of the British Empire.

== Episcopacy ==
On 3 October 1987, Barnes was appointed Bishop of Aitape by Pope John Paul II. He was consecrated by Archbishop Leo Arkfeld SVD on 10 February 1988 at St Ignatius College, Aitape.

On 14 June 1997, he was appointed Archbishop of Port Moresby, following the death of Archbishop Peter Kurongku.

Between 1993 and 1994, he was the President of the Catholic Bishops Conference of Papua New Guinea and Solomon Islands.

As Archbishop, he advocated for the integrity and stability of his adopted homeland, and against corruption within the Papua New Guinea government of his time. He used his weekly radio address to reach the populace and promote these stances. His safety was put at risk for this.

In 1999, Barnes called for a change of government, sparking a response from Papua New Guinea's Prime Minister Bill Skate. The Catholic Bishops of Papua New Guinea issued a statement declaring their support for Barnes and urging the government of Papua New Guinea to do more to meet the needs of the citizens. "Archbishop Barnes has spoken to the leadership of this country on behalf of the people. There are many things that have gone wrong and not much is being done about them," the Bishops said in statement. "The Prime Minister has suggested that we invite him to meet with us. This we will do. However, such a meeting should be taken as an occasion to explain why so little progress is being made by government in dealing with PNG's problems. Rather, we see it as our opportunity to tell the Prime Minister and all political leaders, including those in the Opposition, about the disintegrating state of our society and daily sufferings of the common people at the hands of a self-serving and insensitive government."

Skate ended up facing a scheduled no-confidence motion and resigned as Prime Minister on 7 July 1999 in an effort to save his government. On 14 July 1999, Sir Mekere Morauta succeeded him as prime minister in a vote of 99-5.

In 2003, he was appointed a Knight of the British Empire.

== Retirement and death ==
On 26 March 2008, Barnes retired as Archbishop of Port Moresby, just three days after his 75th birthday, after more than two decades of episcopal ministry. He returned to Australia and lived for a number of years in Waverley.

In 2011, he was made Grand Chief Commander of the Order of Logohu. The ceremony took place at Star of the Sea Friary, Waverley.

He spent his final years at Our Lady of Consolation Nursing Home, Rooty Hill, where he passed away on 9 May 2017, aged 84 years. A Mass of Christian burial was celebrated on 20 May 2017 at Mary Immaculate Church, Waverley. Following the ceremony, his remains were taken to Macquarie Park Cemetery and Crematorium, where he was cremated. After cremation, his remains were flown to Papua New Guinea to be interred at St Didacus Friary Cemetery, Aitape.

Catholic Church titles
Preceded by Peter Kurongku	Archbishop of Port Moresby; 14 June 1997 – 26 March 2008	Succeeded by John Ribat
