= Giovanni Battista de' Rossi (priest) =

Italian Jesuit

Saint Giovanni Battista de' Rossi
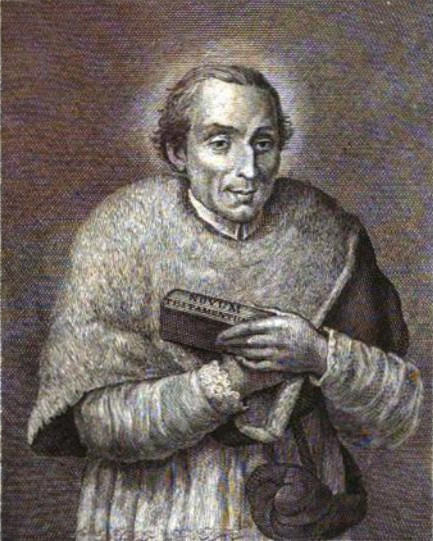

Priest
- Born: 22 February 1698; Voltaggio, Province of Alessandria, Piedmont, Duchy of Savoy
- Died: 23 May 1764 (aged 66); Rome, Papal States
- Venerated in: Roman Catholic Church
- Beatified: 13 May 1860, Saint Peter's Basilica, Papal States by Pope Pius IX
- Canonized: 8 December 1881, Saint Peter's Basilica, Kingdom of Italy by Pope Leo XIII
- Major shrine: Chiesa di San Giovanni Battista de' Rossi, Rome, Italy
- Feast: 23 May
- Attributes: Priest's attire; Crucifix
- Patronage: Voltaggio

Giovanni Battista de' Rossi (22 February 1698 – 23 May 1764) was an Italian Roman Catholic priest. He served as the canon of Santa Maria in Cosmedin after his cousin, who was a priest serving there, died. He was a popular confessor despite his initial fears that his epileptic seizures could manifest in the Confessional. Rossi opened a hospice for homeless women not long after his ordination, and he became known for his work with prisoners and ill people, to whom he dedicated his entire ecclesial mission.

Rossi's canonization was celebrated on 8 December 1881. It had begun decades before but was suspended due to tensions in Europe that meant work could not be pursued regarding the cause; it was later revitalized and he was beatified in 1860.

== Life ==
=== Education and ordination ===
Giovanni Battista de' Rossi was born in February 1698 in Voltaggio, the last of four children of Carlo and Francesca Anfosi de' Rossi, who were poor but pious.

His initial education was under the care of the two priests Scipio Gaetano and Giuseppe Repetto, who noted his potential and brilliance and held him as their favourite student. In 1708, he met after Mass a noble couple (Giovanni Scorza and Maria Battina Cambiasi) from Genoa who, with his father's approval, took Giovanni Battista in as a page after noting his potential, and he went to school there. His father's sudden death in 1710 saw his mother plead with him to return home, but Rossi was firm in his resolve to continue with his studies; his older brother died not long after their father. Rossi met two Capuchin friars at the Scorza residence one evening who thought well of him and offered to help him continue his studies. He had known the friars - or of them - as he mentioned to them that an uncle was a Capuchin.

At the suggestion of his cousin, Lorenzo de' Rossi, canon of Santa Maria in Cosmedin, he travelled to Rome in 1711 in order to commence his studies at the Collegium Romanum under the guidance of the Jesuits. Rossi underwent his philosophical and theological studies at the Dominican College of Saint Thomas. It was around this time that he joined the "Ristretto of the Twelve Apostles". On one occasion, he attended Mass but fainted and was found to have had an epileptic seizure; this would be something he would have to grapple with for the remainder of his life, and it meant he would not be able to attend classes sometimes due to the tiredness and the pain.

His desire to become a priest was strong but was hampered due to his epilepsy, which, under normal circumstances, would exclude one from the priesthood. However, he was granted a special dispensation and was ordained on 8 March. He worked in Rome on behalf of homeless women who wandered the streets and helped to found a hospice for women near Saint Galla's. He also aided prisoners and workers and became a very popular confessor. Rossi became known as a second Philip Neri and had a special devotion to Aloysius Gonzaga.

=== Canon ===
His cousin Lorenzo wanted him as coadjutor to ensure Rossi would become his successor; Giovanni Battista accepted in February 1735. But his cousin soon had a major stroke so violent that it shattered him to the point where his benign character became abrasive and often violent. Lorenzo's servants kept their distance, but Rossi alone remained loving and faithful to his ailing cousin. Lorenzo raged that Rossi was the cause of his suffering and often threw medicine bottles at Rossi's head, drawing blood.

In 1737, after his cousin's death, he became the canon of Santa Maria in Cosmedin and used his position to purchase a new organ for the church. He also sold his cousin's sumptuous home and distributed the funds to the poor. For a long time he avoided hearing confessions, fearing that he would have an epileptic seizure in the confessional, while in 1739 a friend suggested he could do more good hearing confessions. Rossi was not authorized due to his condition and resisted it for a while but was consoled when the Bishop of Civitá Castellana Giovanni Francesco Maria Tenderini told him that it was all part of his vocation. Rossi received authorization to hear confessions, though his obligations to the church choir made it hard for him to go back and forth during Mass to the booth and to the choir. To that end, Pope Clement XII dispensed him from his obligation in the choir so he could hear confessions without distractions; Pope Benedict XIV confirmed this dispensation and made it permanent. But a bitter canon believed that Rossi lied to acquire the dispensation and Rossi soon fell ill due to the distress. But he remained charitable to his now-ill critic, whom he visited several times before that canon died.

=== Declining health and death ===
In 1748 his health became weakened to the point that he moved to Santissima Trinità dei Pellegrini but continued to work at Santa Maria in Cosmedin. In August 1762, his health became so weak that his friends prevailed upon him to go to Lake Nemi to recuperate. But his seizures returned and were far more violent there. In mid-October 1762 he returned to Rome and almost never left his room because of his illness. On 8 September 1763 he celebrated Mass at Santa Maria in Cosmedin where he alluded to those present that he would soon die. On the morning of 27 December 1763, a servant knocked on his door at 8:00 am and found him on the ground half-naked and unconscious after a violent seizure; he was unconscious until 28 December when he was given the Viaticum and the Anointing of the Sick. But those around him were surprised, for he seemed to recover and celebrate several Masses. But his health declined once more, and he was again confined to his sick bed.

His condition deteriorated on 21 May 1764; he died on 23 May 1764 at 9:00 am after multiple strokes. His mortal remains were interred in the main altar of the church of Santissima Trinità dei Pellegrini in Rome, but were relocated in 1965 to a new church named in his honour. Elizabeth Herbert wrote a biographical account of Rossi in English.

=== Titular church ===
A church was dedicated to Rossi in Rome in 1940, though construction was postponed for a while due to World War II. This church was consecrated on 22 May 1965 (with the saint's relics translated the following 23 May from Santissima Trinità dei Pellegrini).

This church - since 1969 - has been a titular church for those cardinals with the rank of Cardinal-Priest.

== Sainthood ==
The cause for canonization began under Pope Pius VI on 27 June 1781 but suffered setbacks due to the French Revolution and the ensuing Napoleonic Wars and Revolutions of 1848. Rossi was beatified after Pope Pius IX attributed two miracles to his intercession on 7 March 1859 and presided over the celebration in Saint Peter's Basilica on 13 May 1860.

On 8 December 1881, the acknowledgement of two more miracles in 1881 enabled Pope Leo XIII to canonize him as a saint of the Roman Catholic Church.
