= Peter Kurongku =

Sir Peter Kurongku KBE
- Archbishop of Port Moresby
- Church: Catholic Church
- Archdiocese: Archdiocese of Port Moresby
- In office: 3 October 1981 – 11 June 1996
- Predecessor: Herman To Paivu
- Successor: Brian James Barnes
- Previous posts: Titular Bishop of Sinnuara (1978-1981); Auxiliary Bishop of Honiara (1978-1981)

Orders
- Ordination: 21 December 1966
- Consecration: 25 March 1979 by Daniel Stuyvenberg

Personal details
- Born: 1930 Tonnui, Bougainville Island, Mandatory Territory of New Guinea, Australia
- Died: June 11, 1996 (aged 65–66)

Most Reverend Sir Peter Kurongku, KBE (1930 – 11 June 1996) was Roman Catholic Archbishop of Port Moresby, Papua New Guinea.

Born in 1930 at Tonnui, he was ordained a priest of Bougainville, Papua New Guinea on 21 December 1966 by Archbishop Daniel Stuyvenberg. On 15 November 1978 he was named Auxiliary Bishop of Honiara, Solomon Islands and as Titular Bishop of Sinnuara on 25 March 1979. On 3 October 1981, he was appointed as Archbishop of Port Moresby and installed the following month.

He was created a Knight Commander of the Most Excellent Order of the British Empire "for public and community services", dated 14 June 1986. He died on 11 June 1996. He had been a priest for 29 years and a bishop for 17 years.
