= Eastview, Frontenac County, Ontario =

Coordinates: 44.26°N 76.38°W

Location of Eastview in Ontario

Eastview is a rural neighbourhood in the east end of Kingston, Ontario. It is located in the former Pittsburgh Township south of Ontario Highway 2, opposite Treasure Island on the Saint Lawrence River.

== See also ==
- Vanier, Ontario (formerly Eastview) in Ottawa
- List of communities in Ontario
