= Bennefa =

Africa Proconsularis (125 AD)

The Diocese of Bennefa (Latin: Rite Bennefensis) is a home suppressed and titular see of the Catholic Church. Bennefa, identifiable with Oglet-Khefifa in modern Tunisia, is an ancient civitas of the Roman province of Byzacena. and a seat of an ancient Christian episcopal see. The diocese was mentioned by Augustine of Hippo.

There are four known bishops of this diocese.

- Guntasio Cabarsussi participated in the council, held in 393 by Maximianus, a dissident sect of the Donatists, and they signed the acts of the conference.
- At the Council of Carthage in 411, Catholic Bishop Emiliano represented the city. The Donatist cause was not represented due to the death of the bishop Maximian on the eve of the conference.
- Among the Catholic bishops summoned to Carthage in 484 by the Vandal king Huneric was Ortolano, who then was exiled, as recalled by the Roman martyrology on the date of 28 November.

Today Bennefa survives as titular bishopric and the current bishop is Héctor Mario Pérez Villarreal, of Monterrey.
