= Diocese of Aitape =

Latin Catholic diocese in Papua New Guinea

Coordinates: 3.1521°S 142.3650°E

The Diocese of Aitape is a Latin Catholic suffragan diocese of the Archdiocese of Madang. It was established in 1952.

== Bishops of Aitape ==
- Ignatius John Doggett, O.F.M. (1952 – 1969)
- William Kevin Rowell, O.F.M. (1969 – 1986)
- Brian James Barnes, O.F.M. (1987 – 1997), appointed Archbishop of Port Moresby
- Austen Robin Crapp, O.F.M. (1999 – 2009)
- Otto Separy (2009 – 2019)
- Siby Mathew Peedikayil, H.G.N. (2021 – present)
