= Benedict To Varpin =

Papua New Guinean Catholic archbishop (1936–2020)

The Most Reverend Benedict To Varpin
- Archbishop of Madang
- Church: Catholic Church
- Archdiocese: Madang
- See: Madang
- In office: 31 December 1987
- Retired: 24 July 2001
- Predecessor: Leo Clement Andrew Arkfeld
- Successor: William Joseph Kurtz S.V.D.
- Previous post: Bishop of Bereina

Orders
- Ordination: 24 January 1971
- Consecration: 19 March 1980 by Louis Vangeke M.S.C.

Personal details
- Born: 24 July 1936 Volavolo, Papua New Guinea
- Died: 8 September 2020 (aged 84) Rabaul, Papua New Guinea
- Denomination: Catholic Church
- Occupation: archbishop
- Profession: priest

Styles of Benedict To Varpin
- Reference style: The Most Reverend
- Spoken style: Your Excellency
- Religious style: Monsignor
- Posthumous style: none

Benedict To Varpin (24 July 1936 – 8 September 2020) was a Papua New Guinean Catholic archbishop.

To Varpin was born in Papua New Guinea and was ordained to the priesthood in 1971. He served as bishop of the Diocese of Bereina, Papua New Guinea from 1979 to 1987. To Varpin served as coadjutor archbishop of the Archdiocese of Madang, Papua New Guinea in 1987 and then archbishop of the archdiocese from 1987 to 2001.

To Varpin died in Rabaul on 8 September 2020.
