= John Ribat =

Papua New Guinean cardinal (born 1957)

His Eminence Sir John Ribat MSC KBE
- Archbishop of Port Moresby
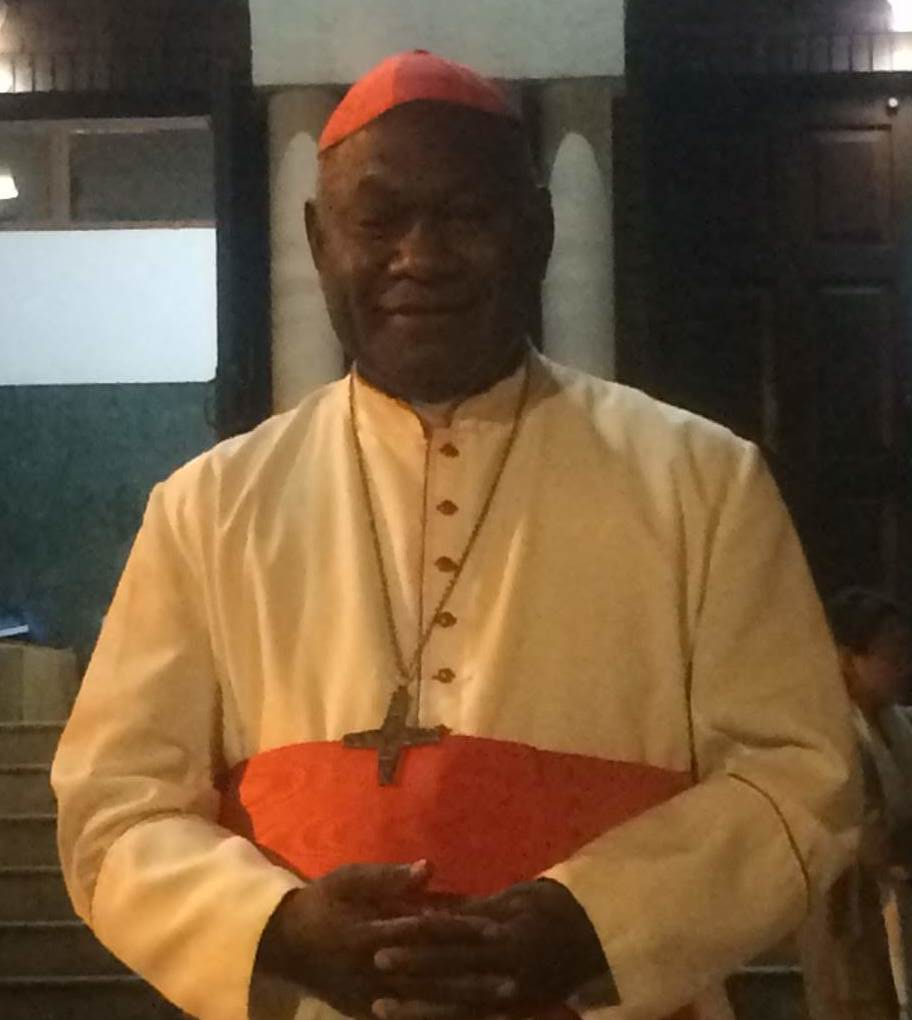
- Ribat in 2019
- Church: Catholic Church
- Archdiocese: Port Moresby
- Appointed: 26 March 2008
- Predecessor: Brian James Barnes
- Other post: Cardinal Priest of San Giovanni Battista de' Rossi (2016–present)
- Previous posts: Bishop of Bereina (2002–2008); Coadjutor Archbishop of Port Moresby (2007–2008)

Orders
- Ordination: 1 December 1985
- Consecration: 11 February 2001 by Gérard-Joseph Deschamps
- Created cardinal: 19 November 2016 by Pope Francis
- Rank: Cardinal priest

Personal details
- Born: John Ribat; 9 February 1957 (age 69) Volavolo, Territory of New Guinea
- Motto: Peace through Jesus' heart
- Coat of arms: Sir John Ribat's coat of arms

Ordination history of John Ribat
History
Episcopal consecration
- Principal consecrator: Gerard-Joseph Deschamps
- Co-consecrators: Brian James Barnes; Benedict To Varpin
Cardinalate
- Elevated by: Pope Francis

Styles of John Ribat
- Reference style: His Eminence
- Spoken style: Your Eminence
- Informal style: Cardinal

Sir John Ribat MSC KBE (born 9 February 1957) is a Papua New Guinean prelate of the Catholic Church and a cardinal since 2016. He has been Archbishop of Port Moresby since 2008.

== Biography ==
Ribat was born in Volavolo, East New Britain, Papua New Guinea. He professed as a member of the Missionaries of the Sacred Heart of Jesus in February 1979. He was ordained a priest on 1 December 1985.

He worked as a parish priest, continued his studies in Manila, and served as master of novices for the Missionaries in Suva, Fiji.

On 30 October 2000, Pope John Paul II named him auxiliary bishop of Bereina and titular bishop of Macriana Minor. He was consecrated bishop on 11 February 2001 and named Bishop of Bereina on 12 February 2002. Pope Benedict XVI named him Coadjutor Archbishop of Port Moresby on 16 April 2007 and he succeeded to that office on 26 March 2008.

Between 2011 and 2014, Ribat was the President of the Catholic Bishops Conference of Papua New Guinea and Solomon Islands.

He was conferred a knighthood on 12 June 2016 in the Queen's Birthday Honours list.

On 9 October 2016, Pope Francis announced that he planned to raise Ribat to the rank of cardinal at a consistory scheduled for 19 November 2016. He was made a Cardinal Priest on that day and assigned to the titular church of San Giovanni Battista de Rossi. He is the first cardinal from his country.

Francis made him a member of the Dicastery for Promoting Integral Human Development on 23 December 2017.

He participated as a cardinal elector in the 2025 papal conclave that elected Pope Leo XIV.

Catholic Church titles
Preceded by Gerard-Joseph Deschamps	Bishop of Bereina; 2002–2007	Succeeded by Rochus Josef Tatamai
Preceded by Brian James Barnes	Archbishop of Port Moresby; 2008–present	Incumbent
Preceded by Julio Terrazas Sandoval	Cardinal Priest of San Giovanni Battista de Rossi; 2016–present	Incumbent
