= Papua New Guinea–Poland relations =

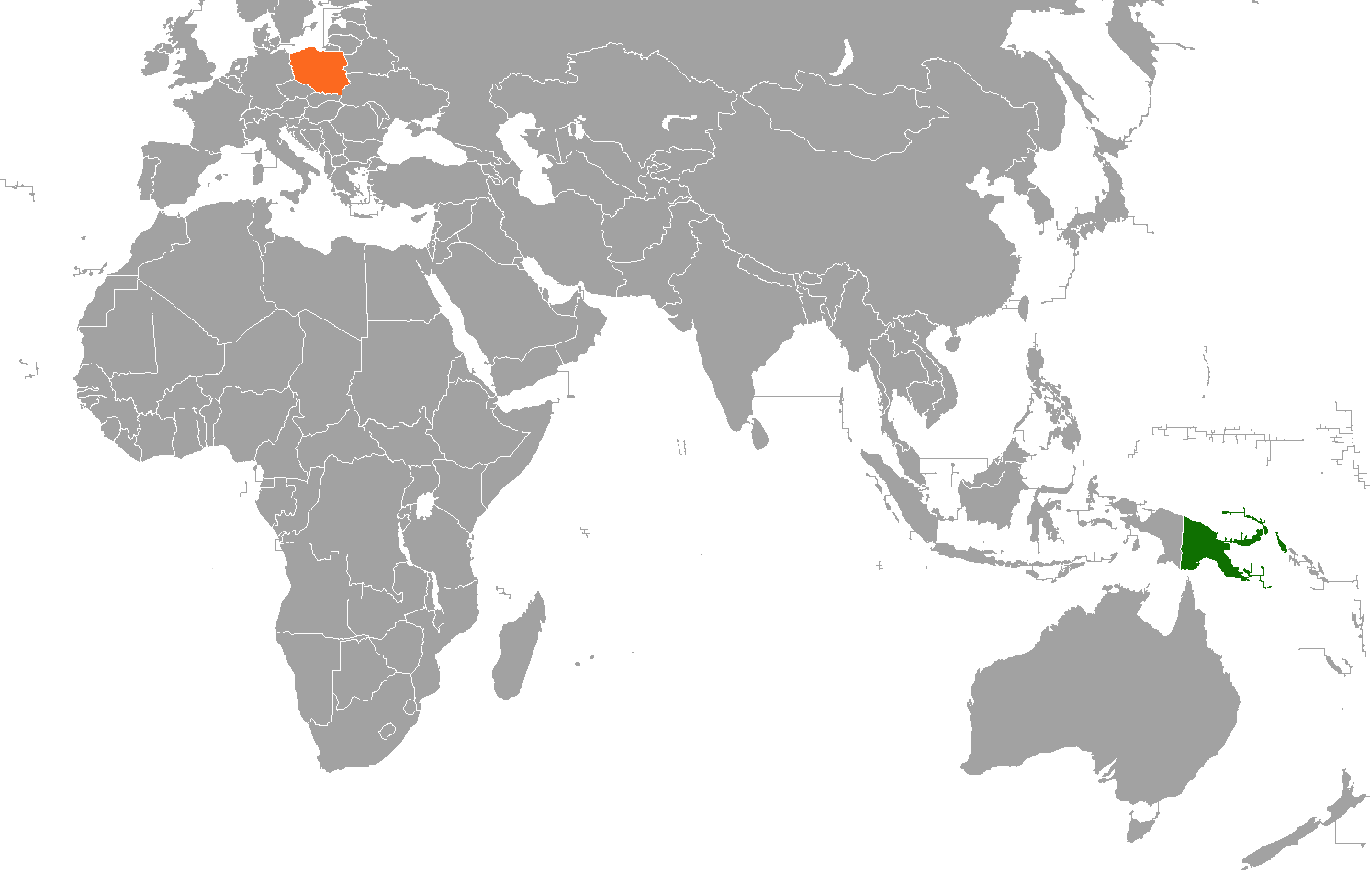
- Papua New Guinea: Poland

Papua New Guinea–Poland relations are the bilateral relations between Papua New Guinea and Poland. Both nations are full members of the World Trade Organization and United Nations.

Poland recognized Papua New Guinea after its declaration of independence, and bilateral relations were established on 10 February 1978.

The Polish Medical Mission sent Polish medics to Papua New Guinea to train local medical personnel there and perform medical procedures.

Polish Catholic missionaries and nuns carry out religious work and support Polish development aid projects in Papua New Guinea. Four Poles were appointed bishops by the Roman Catholic Church in Papua New Guinea. Wilhelm Józef Kurtz was the Archbishop of Madang in 2001–2010, Józef Roszyński is the Bishop of Wewak since 2015, Dariusz Kałuża was the Bishop of Goroka in 2016–2020 and is the Bishop of Bougainville since 2020, and Walenty Gryk is his successor as the Bishop of Goroka since 2022.

== Diplomatic missions ==
- Papua New Guinea is accredited to Poland from its embassy in Brussels.
- Poland is accredited to Papua New Guinea from its embassy in Canberra, and there is an honorary consulate of Poland in Madang.
