= Paul Sundu =

Roman Catholic bishop from Papua New Guinea

- Bishop of Kundiawa
- Church: Catholic Church
- Diocese: Diocese of Kundiawa
- Appointed: 3 April 2021
- Predecessor: Anton Bal

Orders
- Ordination: 17 January 2006
- Consecration: 3 July 2021 by Douglas William Young

Personal details
- Born: 27 July 1973 (age 52) Womatne (northeast of Kundiawa), Territory of New Guinea, Territory of Papua and New Guinea, Australia, British Empire
- Coat of arms

Paul Sundu (born 27 July 1973 in Womatne) is a Papua New Guinean clergyman and bishop for the Roman Catholic Diocese of Kundiawa. He was appointed bishop in 2021.
