= Archdiocese of Mount Hagen =

Latin Catholic archdiocese in Papua New Guinea

Coordinates: 5.8524°S 144.2350°E

Archdiocese of Mount Hagen Archidioecesis Montis Hagensis

Location
- Country: Papua New Guinea
- Headquarters: Mount Hagen

Statistics
- Area: 8,288 km^{2} (3,200 sq mi)
- Population: Total; Catholics: (as of 2023); 771,383; 224,680 (29.1%)
- Parishes: 25

Information
- Denomination: Catholic Church
- Sui iuris church: Latin Church
- Rite: Roman Rite
- Established: 18 June 1959; 66 years ago

Current leadership
- Pope: Leo XIV
- Metropolitan Archbishop: Clement Papa
- Bishops emeritus: Douglas William Young, S.V.D.

The Archdiocese of Mount Hagen (Latin: Archidiœcesis Hagensis Mons) is a Latin Catholic metropolitan archdiocese in Papua New Guinea. It is responsible for the suffragan dioceses of Goroka, Kundiawa, Mendi, and Wabag.

== History ==
The Archdiocese of Mount Hagen was established on 18 June 1959 by Pope John XXIII as the Apostolic Vicariate of Mount Hagen from the territorial cessions of the Apostolic Vicariates of Alexishafen and Wewak. On 15 November 1966, the Apostolic Vicariate of Mount Hagen was elevated to the rank of a diocese, with the Archdiocese of Madang being the metropolitan. On 18 March 1982, the Diocese of Mount Hagen ceded parts of its territory to establish the Diocese of Wabag and was elevated to the rank of an archdiocese.

== Bishops ==
=== Archbishops of Mount Hagen ===
- George Elmer Bernarding, S.V.D. (1959–1987)
- Michael Meier, S.V.D. (1987–2006)
- Douglas William Young, S.V.D. (2006–2025)
- Clement Papa (2025–present)

=== Coadjutor archbishop ===
- Michael Meier, S.V.D. (1984–1987)
- Clement Papa (2024–2025)

=== Auxiliary bishop ===
- Douglas William Young, S.V.D. (2000-2006), appointed Archbishop here

== Witch-hunts in PNG ==
One of the issues is Witch-hunts in Papua New Guinea. Douglas Young, the archbishop of Mount Hagen since 2006, has corroborated one suggested motive. He has said that when young Papua New Guinean men (70-90% of whom are unemployed) see women take on traditionally male roles, they wish to reassert their power and retaliate, leading to witch-hunts and acts of violence against female community members.
