= Donald Francis Lippert =

Donald Francis Lippert O.F.M.Cap.
- Bishop of Mendi
- Church: Catholic Church
- Diocese: Diocese of Mendi
- Appointed: November 22, 2011
- Predecessor: Stephen Joseph Reichert

Orders
- Ordination: June 8, 1985 by Seán Patrick O'Malley
- Consecration: February 4, 2012 by Seán Patrick O'Malley

Personal details
- Born: June 12, 1957 (age 69) Pittsburgh, Pennsylvania, United States
- Coat of arms

Donald Francis Lippert (born June 12, 1957) is a Roman Catholic bishop.

Born in Pittsburgh, Pennsylvania, Lippert was ordained a priest on June 8, 1985, for the Capuchin order. On November 22, 2011, Lippert was appointed bishop of the Roman Catholic Diocese of Mendi, Papua New Guinea and was ordained a bishop on February 4, 2012.
