= Francesco Sarego =

Francesco Sarego SVD
- Bishop Emeritus of Goroka
- Church: Catholic Church
- Diocese: Diocese of Goroka
- In office: 6 December 1995 – 9 June 2016
- Predecessor: Michael Marai
- Successor: Dariusz Kałuża

Orders
- Ordination: 20 August 1986
- Consecration: 27 April 1996 by Michael Meier

Personal details
- Born: 1 August 1939 (age 86) Cologna Veneta, Province of Verona, Kingdom of Italy

Francesco Sarego (born August 1, 1939, in Cologna Veneta) is an Italian former clergyman and bishop for the Roman Catholic Diocese of Goroka. He was appointed bishop in 1995.

Between 2005 and 2008, he was the President of the Catholic Bishops Conference of Papua New Guinea and Solomon Islands.

Francesco Sarego retired in 2016.

== See also ==
- Catholic Church in Poland
