= Firmin Martin Schmidt =

Firmin Martin Schmidt O.F.M.Cap.
- Bishop of Mendi
- Church: Catholic Church
- Diocese: Diocese of Mendi
- In office: April 3, 1959 – February 3, 1995
- Predecessor: Prefecture established
- Successor: Stephen Joseph Reichert
- Previous post: Titular Bishop of Conana (1965-1966)

Orders
- Ordination: June 2, 1946 by Francis Augustine Thill
- Consecration: December 15, 1965 by John Wright

Personal details
- Born: October 12, 1918 Catharine, Kansas, United States
- Died: October 4, 2005 (aged 86)

Firmin Martin Schmidt (October 12, 1918 – August 4, 2005) was a Roman Catholic bishop.

Born in Catharine, Kansas, United States, Schmidt was ordained a priest for the Capuchin order on June 2, 1946. On April 3, 1959, he was appointed prefect of Mendi, Papua New Guinea, and then vicar apostolic of Mendi and titular bishop of Conana on June 6, 1965; he was ordained bishop on December 15, 1965. On November 15, 1966, he was appointed first bishop of the Roman Catholic Diocese of Mendi retiring on February 3, 1995.
