= Johannes Henricus J. Te Maarssen =

Dutch Roman Catholic bishop

Johannes Henricus J. Te Maarssen SVD
- Bishop Emeritus of Kundiawa
- Church: Catholic Church
- Diocese: Diocese of Kundiawa
- In office: 10 May 2000 – 12 January 2009
- Predecessor: William Joseph Kurtz
- Successor: Anton Bal

Orders
- Ordination: 31 January 1960
- Consecration: 24 August 2000 by William Joseph Kurtz

Personal details
- Born: 3 September 1933 (age 92) Groenlo, Gelderland, Netherlands

Johannes Henricus J. Te Maarssen (born 3 September 1933 in Groenlo) is a Dutch clergyman and bishop for the Roman Catholic Diocese of Kundiawa. He was appointed bishop in 2000. He retired in 2009.

== See also ==
- Catholic Church in the Netherlands
