= Telmin =

Telmin may refer to:

- an oasis in present Tunisia, the site of Ancient Tamalluma, a former city in the Roman province of Byzacena, now a Latin Catholic titular bishopric
- Mebendazole (MBZ), a medication to treat a number of parasitic worm infestations
