= Anthony Joseph Burgess =

Australian Roman Catholic bishop (1938–2013)

- Bishop of Wewak
- Church: Catholic Church
- Diocese: Diocese of Wewak
- In office: 14 August 2002 – 20 September 2013
- Predecessor: Raymond Kalisz
- Successor: Józef Roszyński
- Previous post: Coadjutor Bishop of Wewak (2000-2002)

Orders
- Ordination: 23 July 1967
- Consecration: 27 September 2000 by Raymond Kalisz

Personal details
- Born: 29 July 1938 Singleton, New South Wales, Australia
- Died: 23 October 2013 (aged 75)

Anthony Joseph Burgess (29 July 1938 − 23 October 2013) was an Australian-born Papua New Guinean Roman Catholic bishop.

== Early life ==
Burgess was born in Singleton, New South Wales, the eldest of eight children born to Bert and Dell Burgess. He received his primary education at St Xavier's Primary School, Singleton, with the Sisters of Mercy before winning a scholarship to study at St Stanislaus' College, Bathurst, run by the Congregation of the Mission (Vincentians). He later returned to his home and obtained his leaving certificate from Marist Brothers High School, Maitland. Two of his sisters entered religious life. One joined the Sisters of Mercy in Singleton while another joined the Daughters of the Sacred Heart in Kensington.

After working briefly for his father's business, he joined St Columba's College, Springwood to begin studies for the priesthood for the Diocese of Maitland. Archbishop Guilford Clyde Young came to the seminary looking for students for the Archdiocese of Hobart to boost the number of priests in the scattered Tasmanian diocese. Burgess agreed to join and went to study at Corpus Christi College, Melbourne in 1963, where his classmates included George Pell and Denis Hart.

== Priesthood ==
Burgess was ordained to the priesthood on 23 July 1967 at St John's Pro-Cathedral, Maitland by Bishop Launcelot Goody for the Archdiocese of Hobart. Bishop John Toohey was due to ordain him but was too ill to perform the ordination. Following his ordination, Burgess served in the parishes of Launceston and Queenstown.

In 1973, a request came from the Bishop of Aitape, seeking priests for the West Sepik province of Papua New Guinea. Burgess once again accepted to join. His first appointment was at Lumi, a large government station, where the local parish was under the care of Franciscans. He also briefly cared for Karaitem.

In 1977, he returned to minister in the Archdiocese of Hobart, serving in the parishes of Queenstown and Beaconsfield, before returning to Papua New Guinea in 1982.

In 1982, he was appointed to Wassisi. When the airlines collapsed in the country, he helped to distribute supplies in the region, with all supplies for the government and missions flowing through his parish. Following the appointment of Brian James Barnes as Bishop of Aitape, Burgess was appointed Vicar General of the Diocese.

== Episcopacy ==
On 10 May 2000, Burgess was appointed Coadjutor Bishop of Diocese of Wewak. He was ordained a bishop on 27 September 2000 by Bishop Raymond Philip Kalisz SVD, Bishop of Wewak. Burgess succeeded Bishop Kalisz on 14 August 2002 to become Bishop of Wewak.

As Bishop, Burgess was known for working long hours. In 2011, he became ill but continued to minister to the people of Wewak. On 18 April 2013, he was invested with the insignia of the Grand Companion of the Order of Logohu with the title of Chief (GCL). Due to the closeness with the Franciscans, he became a Secular Franciscan.

On 8 September 2013, he was airlifted from Papua New Guinea to Sydney after collapsing in the midst of a battle with cancer. On 20 September 2013, Pope Francis accepted his resignation from the pastoral governance of the Diocese of Wewak.

== Death ==
On 23 October 2013, he died in Sydney just over a month after retiring from episcopal ministry. His funeral took place on 30 October 2013 at St Mary's Cathedral, Sydney. He was buried at Macquarie Park Cemetery, North Ryde.
