= Dariusz Kałuża =

Roman Catholic bishop in Papua New Guinea

Dariusz Kałuża MSF
- Bishop of Bougainville
- Appointed: 12 September 2020
- Previous post: Bishop of Goroka (2016 – 2020)

Orders
- Ordination: 5 May 1993
- Consecration: 20 August 2016 by Francesco Sarego

Personal details
- Born: 5 November 1967 (age 58) Pszczyna

Dariusz Piotr Kałuża (born 5 November 1967) is a Catholic bishop of the Diocese of Bouganville since 2020. He previously served as bishop of the Diocese of Goroka from 2016 to 2020.

== Biography ==
Kałuża was born on 5 November 1967 in Pszczyna. After completing his education at a minor seminary in Częstochowa in 1985, he entered the Congregation of Missionaries of the Holy Family. He professed his religious vows in 1987, after which he studied philosophy and theology at a seminary in Kazimierz Biskupi. He was ordained a priest on 5 May 1993.

After his ordination, Kałuża served as parish vicar for 3 years in Złotów. After taking an English language course in the United Kingdom, he was sent to Papua New Guinea to do mission work. There, he served as vicar for two parishes in the Diocese of Mendi, while also serving as its vicar general. In 2015, he was made a pastoral vicar in the Archdiocese of Madang.

On 9 June 2016, Kałuża was appointed bishop of the Diocese of Goroka by Pope Francis; he was consecrated on 20 August 2016 by Francesco Sarego. He was appointed bishop of the Diocese of Bouganville on 12 September 2020 by Pope Francis.
