= Bernard Schilling =

Bernard Schilling (born in 1914 in Somborn) was a German clergyman and bishop for the Roman Catholic Diocese of Goroka. He was appointed vicar apostolic of Goroka and titular bishop of Callipolis in 1959. He resigned in 1966 due to ill health. He died in 1992.
