= Leoville, Kansas =

Unincorporated community in Decatur County, Kansas

- Unincorporated community
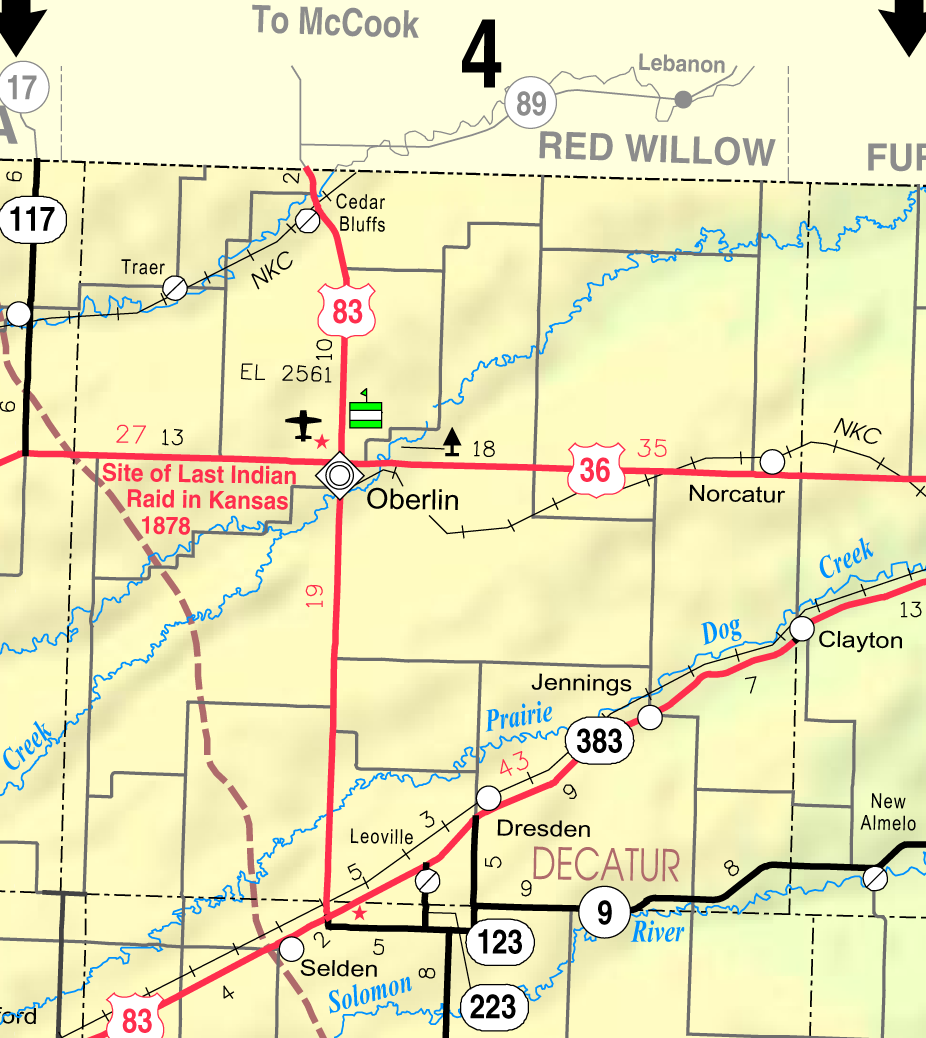
- KDOT map of Decatur County (legend)

- Location within Kansas Location within the United States
- Coordinates: 39°34′54″N 100°27′40″W
- Country: United States
- State: Kansas
- County: Decatur
- Founded: 1885
- Named for: Pope Leo XIII
- Elevation: 2,753 ft (839 m)
- Time zone: UTC-6 (CST)
  - Summer (DST): UTC-5 (CDT)
- Area code: 785
- FIPS code: 20-39600
- GNIS ID: 471110

Leoville is an unincorporated community in Decatur County, Kansas, United States. Leoville is located along K-223 3.6 miles (5.8 km) south-southwest of Dresden.

== History ==
Leoville was founded in 1885 by a colony of German Catholics. They named their community in honor of Pope Leo XIII.

== Education ==
The community is served by Hoxie USD 412 public school district.

Leoville schools were closed through school unification. The Leoville High School mascot was Leoville Lions.

== Notable people ==
- Roman Catholic Archbishop Stephen Joseph Reichert was born in Leoville.
