= Anton Bal =

Roman Catholic archbishop from Papua New Guinea born 1963

The Most Reverend Anton Bal
- Archbishop of Madang
- Church: Roman Catholic Church
- Archdiocese: Madang
- See: Madang
- Appointed: 26 July 2019
- Installed: 31 October 2019
- Predecessor: Stephen Joseph Reichert
- Previous post(s): Titular Bishop of Tamalluma (2007-09); Auxiliary Bishop of Kundiawa (2007-09); Bishop of Kundiawa (2009-19)

Orders
- Ordination: 17 December 1991 by William Joseph Kurtz
- Consecration: 10 September 2007 by Johannes Henricus Te Maarssen

Personal details
- Born: Anton Bal; 29 November 1963 (age 61); Yuri, Kundiawa, Papua New Guinea
- Motto: Go na to kim
- Coat of arms

Anton Bal (born 29 November 1963) is a Roman Catholic archbishop from Papua New Guinea.

Born in Yuri (Kundiawa), Bal was ordained to the priesthood on 17 December 1991. On 5 June 2007, Bal was appointed auxiliary bishop of the Roman Catholic Diocese of Kundiawa and titular bishop of Tamalluma; he was ordained a bishop on 10 September 2007. He was then appointed bishop of the Roman Catholic Diocese of Kundiawa on 12 January 2009. He was then appointed archbishop of the metropolitan Roman Catholic Archdiocese of Madang on 26 July 2019.

Anton Bal was appointed president of the Catholic Bishops Conference of Papua New Guinea and Solomon Islands in 2020.
