= Kępa, Opole Voivodeship =

Kępa Kempa
- Village
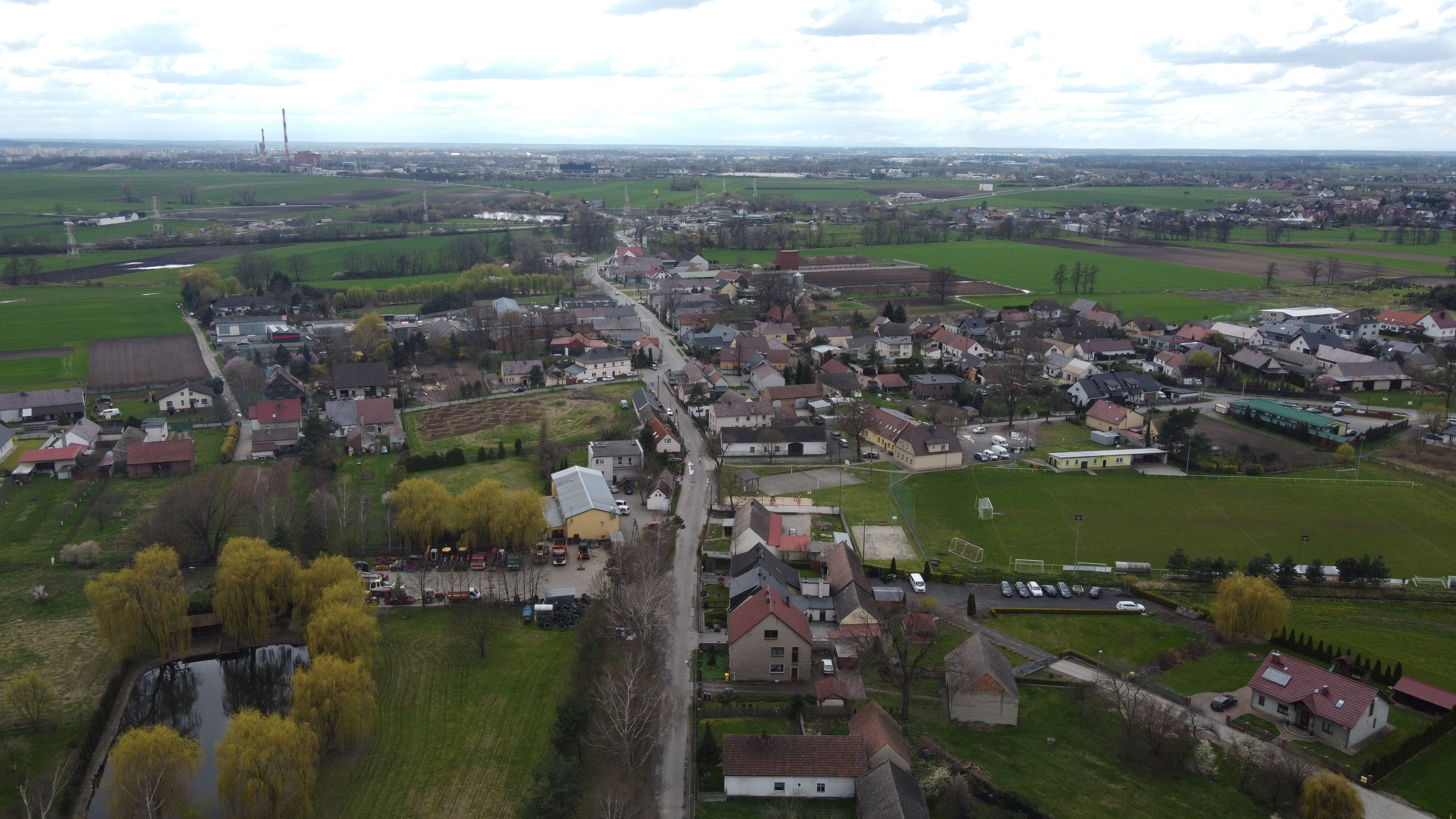

- Location within Poland
- Coordinates: 50°43′N 17°57′E
- Country: Poland
- Voivodeship: Opole
- County: Opole
- Gmina: Łubniany
- Time zone: UTC+1 (CET)
  - Summer (DST): UTC+2 (CEST)
- Postal code: 46-022
- Vehicle registration: OPO

Kępa ([ˈkɛmpa], additional name in German: Kempa) is a village in the administrative district of Gmina Łubniany, within Opole County, Opole Voivodeship, in southern Poland.

The name of the village is of Polish origin and comes from the word kępa, meaning a small island on a river or lake.

== Notable people ==
- Wilhelm Józef Kurtz (1935–2023), Polish archbishop of the Roman Catholic Church
