= Camisio Teodoro Gellings =

German clergyman and bishop

Camisio Teodoro Gellings (born 1880 in Germany) was a German clergyman and bishop for the Roman Catholic Diocese of Wewak. He was ordained in 1907. He was appointed bishop in 1913. He died in 1959.
