= Michael Marai =

Bishop of Goroka (1948–2021)

- Bishop of Goroka
- Church: Catholic Church
- Diocese: Diocese of Goroka
- In office: 25 October 1988 – 15 November 1994
- Predecessor: Raymond Caesar
- Successor: Francesco Sarego

Orders
- Ordination: 6 December 1976
- Consecration: 23 February 1989 by Leo Arkfeld

Personal details
- Born: 1948 Mushu Island (north of the coast of Wewak), Territory of New Guinea, Australia
- Died: 3 November 2021 (aged 72–73) Wewak, East Sepik Province, Papua New Guinea

Michael Marai (1948 – November 3, 2021) was a Papua New Guinean Roman Catholic prelate and bishop emeritus of Goroka. He served as the Bishop of the Roman Catholic Diocese of Goroka from 1988 until in 1994.

Marai was born in 1948 on Mushu Island, Territory of Papua and New Guinea, in present-day East Sepik Province, Papua New Guinea. He was ordained as a Roman Catholic priest on December 6, 1976. He was appointed Bishop of the Diocese of Goroka on October 25, 1988. Marai served as the bishop until he stepped down on November 15, 1994.

Marai died from cancer at the Wirui Retirement House in Wewak, Papua New Guinea, on November 3, 2021, at the age of 73. His funeral mass was held at the Wirui Sound Shell in Wirui on November 16, 2021. He was buried in Wirui Cemetery alongside other PNG bishops, including Leo Arkfeld and Cherubim Dambui.
