= Josef Lörks =

German clergyman

Josef Lörks S.V.D.
- Vicar Apostolic of Central New Guinea
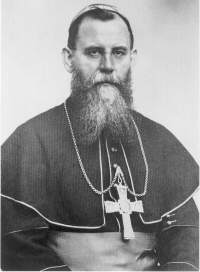
- Church: Catholic Church
- See: Apostolic Vicariate of Central New Guinea
- In office: 19 June 1928 – 17 March 1943
- Predecessor: Theodosius Jan J. Herkenrath
- Successor: Leo Arkfeld
- Other post: Titular Bishop of Medeli (1933-1945)

Orders
- Ordination: 18 January 1900
- Consecration: 17 December 1933 by Karl Joseph Schulte

Personal details
- Born: 24 March 1876 Hanselaer (in present-day Kalkar), Rhine Province, Kingdom of Prussia, German Empire
- Died: 17 March 1943 (aged 66)
- Motto: Adveniat Regnum Tuum

Josef Lörks (24 March 1876 in Kalkar-Hanselaer – 17 March 1943) was a German clergyman and bishop for the Roman Catholic Diocese of Wewak.

Born in Hanselaer, Germany, he was a missionary priest in New Guinea since 1900. He was appointed bishop in 1928. He was consecrated for the East New Guinea (Wewak) Vicariate Apostolic in 1933.

In December 1942, he was incarcerated in a Japanese prison on Kairiru Island near Wewak. In March 1943, following the naval battle of Coral Sea, he was taken aboard the destroyer Akikaze where prisoners were shot at three-minute intervals.
