= William Joseph Kurtz =

Polish bishop (1935–2023)

His Excellency William Joseph Kurtz
- Archbishop Emeritus of Madang
- Installed: 24 July 2001
- Term ended: 30 November 2010
- Predecessor: Benedict To Varpin
- Successor: Stephen Joseph Reichert
- Previous posts: Bishop of Kundiawa (1982–1999); Coadjutor Archbishop of Madang (1999–2001)

Orders
- Ordination: 28 January 1962 by Józef Drzazga
- Consecration: 8 September 1982 by Raymond Rodly Caesar

Personal details
- Born: 28 May 1935 Kempa, Gau Silesia, Germany
- Died: 14 February 2023 (aged 87) Kundiawa, Papua New Guinea

Wilhelm Józef Kurtz (anglicised to William Joseph Kurtz; 28 May 1935 – 14 February 2023) was a Polish prelate of the Catholic Church.

Kurtz was born in Kempa, Gau Silesia (now Kępa, Opole Voivodeship). He was ordained to the priesthood as a member of the Society of the Divine Word in 1962. He was appointed Bishop of Kundiawa, Papua New Guinea, in 1982, serving until he was named coadjutor archbishop of Madang in 1999. He succeeded Benedict To Varpin as archbishop in 2001, and retired from this position in 2010.

Catholic Church titles
Preceded by Benedict To Varpin	Archbishop Emeritus of Madang; 2001–2010	Succeeded by Stephen Joseph Reichert
Preceded by Post created	Bishop of Kundiawa; 1982–1999	Succeeded by Johannes Henricus J. Te Maarssen
