= Teodosio Heikenrath =

Teodosio Heikenrath was a clergyman and bishop for the Roman Catholic Diocese of Wewak. He was appointed bishop in 1922. He died in 1923.
