= Catharine, Kansas =

Unincorporated community in Ellis County, Kansas

- Unincorporated community and CDP
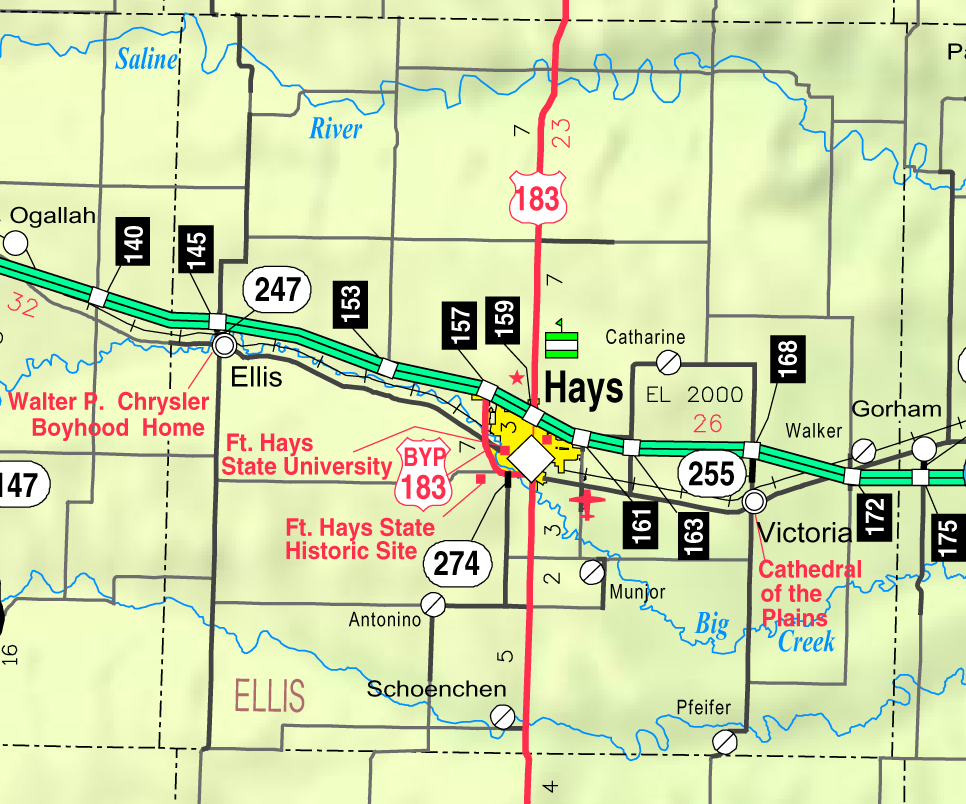
- KDOT map of Ellis County (legend)

- Location within Kansas Location within the United States
- Coordinates: 38°55′49″N 99°12′52″W
- Country: United States
- State: Kansas
- County: Ellis
- Founded: 1876

Area
  - Total: 1.77 sq mi (4.58 km^{2})
  - Land: 1.77 sq mi (4.58 km^{2})
  - Water: 0 sq mi (0.0 km^{2})
- Elevation: 2,021 ft (616 m)

Population (2020)
  - Total: 113
  - Density: 63.9/sq mi (24.7/km^{2})
- Time zone: UTC-6 (CST)
  - Summer (DST): UTC-5 (CDT)
- ZIP Code: 67627
- Area code: 785
- FIPS code: 20-11025
- GNIS ID: 2629155

Catharine is an unincorporated community and census-designated place (CDP) in Ellis County, Kansas, United States. As of the 2020 census, the population was 113.

== History ==
Volga German immigrants founded and settled Catharine in April 1876, naming it after Katharinenstadt, the town they came from in Russia. Katharinenstadt was the economic center of the German colonies in Russia and, as a result, Catharine's settlers were initially wealthier than those of other Volga German settlements in the area. More German settlers from Katharinenstadt arrived over the next two years followed by Austrians from Moravia beginning in 1878.

The community's first school opened in 1879 and doubled as a church until the completion of St. Catherine's Catholic Church in 1892. The first post office in Catharine opened in 1882.

== Geography ==
Catharine lies on the eastern side of North Fork Big Creek, part of the Smoky Hill River watershed, in the Smoky Hills region of the Great Plains. Catharine is roughly 3 miles (4.8 km) north of Interstate 70 and 6 miles (9.7 km) northeast of Hays, the county seat.

=== Climate ===
The climate in this area is characterized by hot, humid summers and generally mild to cool winters. According to the Köppen Climate Classification system, Catharine has a humid subtropical climate, abbreviated "Cfa" on climate maps.

== Demographics ==
Historical population
Census	Pop.	Note	%±
2010	104		—
2020	113		8.7%
U.S. Decennial Census

The 2020 United States census counted 113 people, 56 households, and 40 families in Catharine. The population density was 63.8 per square mile (24.6/km^{2}). There were 62 housing units at an average density of 35.0 per square mile (13.5/km^{2}). The racial makeup was 95.58% (108) white or European American (94.69% non-Hispanic white), 0.0% (0) black or African-American, 0.88% (1) Native American or Alaska Native, 0.0% (0) Asian, 0.0% (0) Pacific Islander or Native Hawaiian, 0.0% (0) from other races, and 3.54% (4) from two or more races. Hispanic or Latino of any race was 1.77% (2) of the population.

Of the 56 households, 17.9% had children under the age of 18; 66.1% were married couples living together; 25.0% had a female householder with no spouse or partner present. 28.6% of households consisted of individuals and 16.1% had someone living alone who was 65 years of age or older. The average household size was 2.9 and the average family size was 3.2. The percent of those with a bachelor's degree or higher was estimated to be 28.3% of the population.

18.6% of the population was under the age of 18, 2.7% from 18 to 24, 15.9% from 25 to 44, 31.9% from 45 to 64, and 31.0% who were 65 years of age or older. The median age was 54.5 years. For every 100 females, there were 121.6 males. For every 100 females ages 18 and older, there were 135.9 males.

The 2016–2020 5-year American Community Survey estimates show that the median household income was $115,781 (with a margin of error of +/- $50,420) and the median family income was $116,172 (+/- $40,948). The median income for those above 16 years old was $54,886 (+/- $36,126). Approximately, 0.0% of families and 4.1% of the population were below the poverty line, including 0.0% of those under the age of 18 and 0.0% of those ages 65 or over.

=== 2010 census ===
As of the 2010 census, there were 104 people, 49 households, and 29 families residing in the community. There were 59 housing units. The racial makeup of the community was 100.0% White. Hispanics or Latinos of any race were 1.0% of the population.

There were 49 households, out of which 28.6% had children under the age of 18 living with them, 53.1% were married couples living together, 4.1% had a male householder with no wife present, 2.0% had a female householder with no husband present, and 40.8% were non-families. 40.8% of all households were made up of individuals, and 16.3% had someone living alone who was 65 years of age or older. The average household size was 2.12, and the average family size was 2.86.

In the community, the population was spread out, with 19.2% under the age of 18, 6.6% from 18 to 24, 27.0% from 25 to 44, 32.8% from 45 to 64, and 14.4% who were 65 years of age or older. The median age was 41.5 years. For every 100 females, there were 92.6 males. For every 100 females age 18 and over, there were 104.9 males age 18 and over.

== Education ==
The community is served by Hays USD 489 public school district.

== Transportation ==
Catherine Road, a paved county road, runs east–west along the northern edge of the town.

== Notable people ==
- Firmin Schmidt, Roman Catholic Bishop, was born in Catharine.
- Ron Schueler, Major League Baseball pitcher, coach and executive, was born in Catharine.
