= Adalberto Ottone Rielander =

Adalberto Ottone Rielander was a clergyman and bishop for the Roman Catholic Diocese of Wewak. He was appointed bishop in 1918. He died in 1922.
