= Stephen Joseph Reichert =

Stephen Joseph Reichert O.F.M.Cap.
- Archbishop Emeritus of Madang
- Church: Catholic Church
- Archdiocese: Archdiocese of Madang
- In office: 30 November 2010 – 26 July 2019
- Predecessor: William Joseph Kurtz
- Successor: Anton Bal
- Other post: Apostolic Administrator of Wewak (2013-2015)
- Previous post: Bishop of Mendi (1995-2010)

Orders
- Ordination: 27 September 1969 by Cyril John Vogel
- Consecration: 7 May 1995 by Firmin Martin Schmidt

Personal details
- Born: May 14, 1943 (age 83) Leoville, Kansas, United States
- Coat of arms

Stephen Joseph Reichert (May 14, 1943) is a Roman Catholic archbishop-emeritus.

Born in Leoville, Kansas, United States, Reichert was ordained to the priesthood for the Capuchin order on September 27, 1969. On February 3, 1995, Reichert was appointed bishop of the Roman Catholic Diocese of Mendi, Papua New Guinea and was ordained a bishop on May 7, 1995. He was then appointed archbishop of the Roman Catholic Archdiocese of Madang, Papua New Guinea on November 30, 2010.

Between 1999 and 2002, he was the President of the Catholic Bishops Conference of Papua New Guinea and Solomon Islands.

Reichert resignation upon having reached the age limit was accepted on July 26, 2019.
