= Raymond Caesar =

American Roman Catholic bishop in Papua New Guinea

His Excellency, The Most Reverend Raymond Caesar SVD
- Bishop of Goroka
- Appointed: August 30, 1980
- Term ended: June 18, 1987
- Predecessor: John Edward Cohill
- Successor: Michael Marai
- Other posts: President of Bishops’ Conference of Papua New Guinea and Solomon Islands (1983 – 1984)

Orders
- Ordination: June 4th, 1961
- Consecration: October 25, 1978 by John Edward Cohill, Adolph Alexander Noser, and Herman To Paivu

Personal details
- Born: February 14, 1932 Eunice, Louisiana
- Died: June 8, 1987 (aged 55) Goroka, Papua New Guinea

Raymond Rodly Caesar, SVD (14 February 1932 – 18 June 1987) was an American prelate of the Catholic Church who served as Bishop of Goroka in Papua New Guinea from 1980 until his death in 1987. He was the first African American to serve as a Catholic bishop outside of the United States.

== Biography ==
Born in Eunice, Louisiana, to Celina Comeaux and Prosper Caesar, Caesar was ordained to the priesthood for the Society of the Divine Word in 1961, during a period when African-American priests were still few and far-between.

He had graduated from St. Augustine Seminary in Bay St. Louis, Mississippi, the only seminary in the United States created to educate African Americans specifically. The White Supremacist climate of the United States at the time dictated, for most Catholic ordinaries, that Black priests could not enter their seminaries or serve in their dioceses—which meant that the first prospective Black priests from the US were sent to study abroad. Most of these priests were also sent to serve abroad after ordination.

Caesar was one such priest, who after his ordination in 1961 would go on to become a Monsignor as well as a bishop outside of the US (in Papua New Guinea), as the SVD order served diocese across the globe. Caesar was the first African-American Catholic bishop abroad.

He was appointed as coadjutor bishop of the Diocese of Goroka in 1978, and would become the ordinary only two years later, making him the second-ever African-American ordinary anywhere in the world (after Joseph Lawson Howze in 1977). He served as president of the local bishops' conference from 1983-1984.

He died in 1987 while still in office.

== Personal life ==
Caesar's cousin, Fr Roger Caesar, SSJ, was a Josephite priest in the United States.
