= Archdiocese of Madang =

Latin Catholic archdiocese in Papua New Guinea

Coordinates: 5.2218°S 145.8070°E

Archdiocese of Madang Archidioecesis Madangana
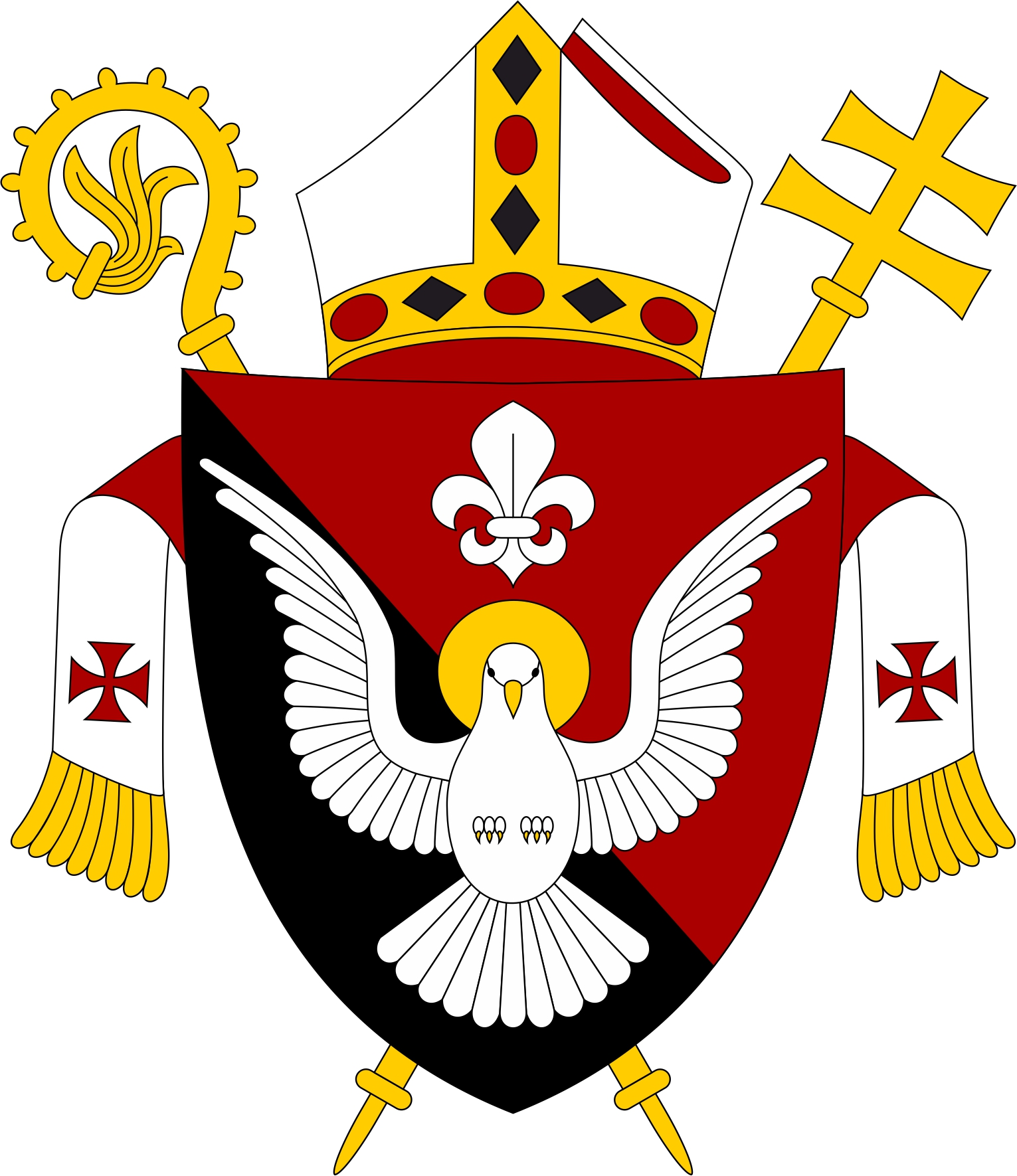

Location
- Country: Papua New Guinea

Statistics
- Area: 28,732 km^{2} (11,093 sq mi)
- Population: Total; Catholics: (as of 2016); 521216; 180224 (24.58%)

Information
- Denomination: Catholic Church
- Sui iuris church: Latin Church
- Rite: Roman Rite
- Cathedral: Holy Spirit Cathedral

Current leadership
- Pope: Leo XIV
- Metropolitan Archbishop: Anton Bal
- Bishops emeritus: Stephen Joseph Reichert, OFMCap

The Archdiocese of Madang is a Latin Catholic metropolitan archdiocese in Papua New Guinea with suffragan dioceses of Aitape, Lae, Vanimo and Wewak.

The Archdiocese was created in 1966 when it was elevated from a predecessor see.

The Metropolitan Archbishop of Madang, appointed by Pope Francis on 26 July 2019, is the former Bishop of Kundiawa, Papua New Guinea, Anton Bal. He succeeded Archbishop Stephen Joseph Reichert, OFMCap, whose resignation was accepted after he reached the age limit.

== Bishops ==
=== Archbishops of Madang (and Ordinaries of predecessor sees) ===
- Everardo Limbrock, SVD (1896-1914)
- Francesco Wolf, SVD (1922-1944)
- Stephen A. Appelhans, SVD (1948-1951)
- Adolph Alexander Noser, SVD (1953-1975)
- Leo Clement Andrew Arkfeld, SVD (1975-1987)
- Benedict To Varpin (1987-2001)
- William Joseph Kurtz, SVD (2001-2010) - presently Archbishop Emeritus
- Stephen Joseph Reichert, OFMCap (2010-2019), a Capuchin - presently Archbishop emeritus
- Anton Bal (2019–present); former Bishop Kundiawa, Papua New Guinea

=== Coadjutor archbishops ===
- Benedict To Varpin (1987)
- William Joseph Kurtz, SVD (1999-2001)
