= John Edward Cohill =

American clergyman and bishop

John Edward Cohill (December 13, 1907 – June 13, 1994) was an American clergyman and bishop for the Roman Catholic Diocese of Goroka in Papua New Guinea. He was born in Elizabeth, New Jersey in 1907. Cohill was ordained to the priesthood in 1936. He was appointed bishop in 1966. He died in 1994.

In July 1946 he was based at the Mugil mission in (now) Papua New Guinea. This is about 70 kilometres north of Madang. On 7 July 1946 a US Army ship, FS-172, ran aground near the mission and he helped rescue all the men.
