= Diocese of Goroka =

Latin Catholic diocese in Papua New Guinea

Coordinates: 6.0854°S 145.3870°E

The Diocese of Goroka is a Latin Catholic suffragan diocese of the Archdiocese of Mount Hagen, based in Goroka. It was erected Vicariate Apostolic in 1959 and elevated to a diocese in 1966. In 1982, part of the diocese was separated to become the Diocese of Kundiawa.

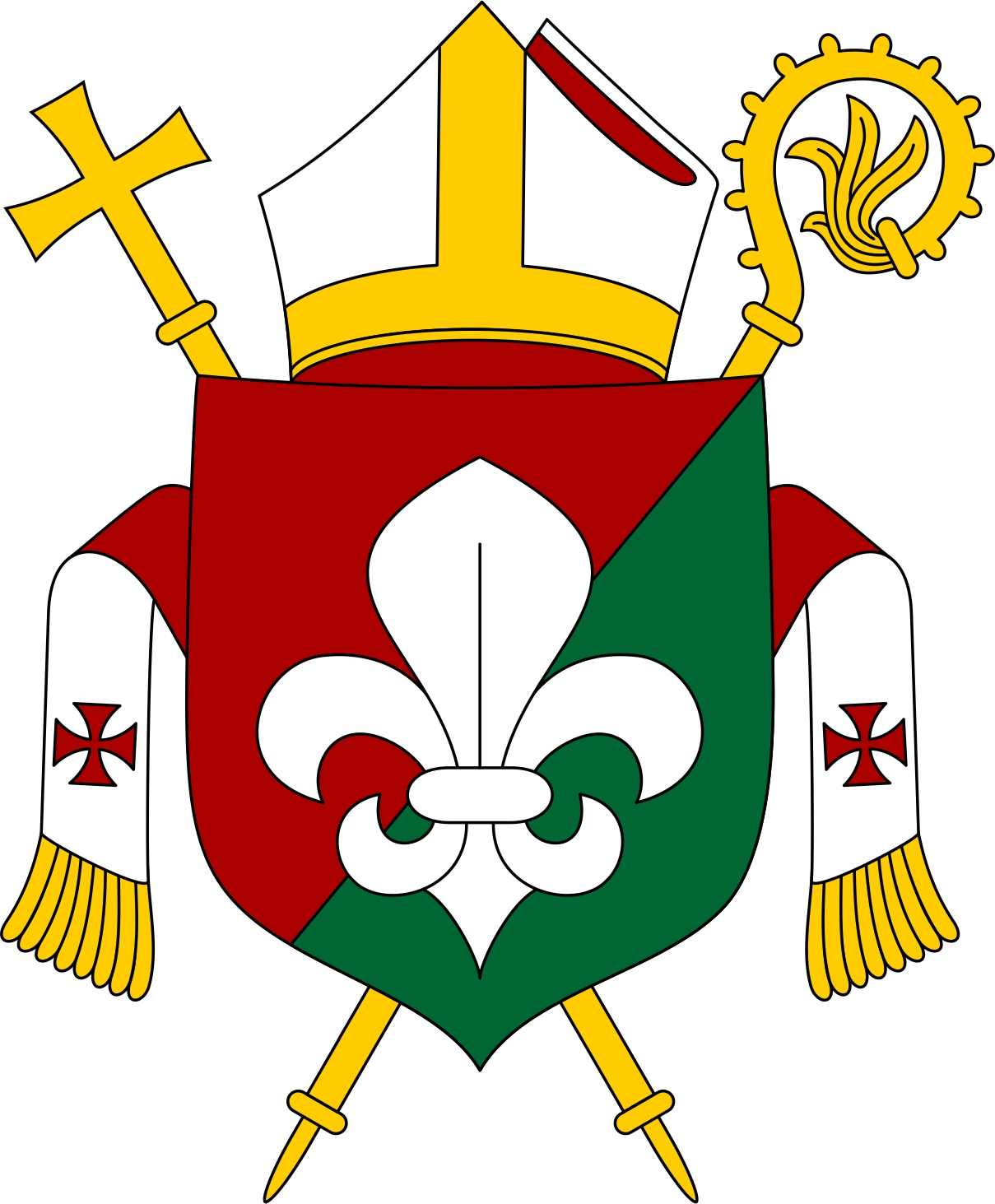
Diocesan coat of arms

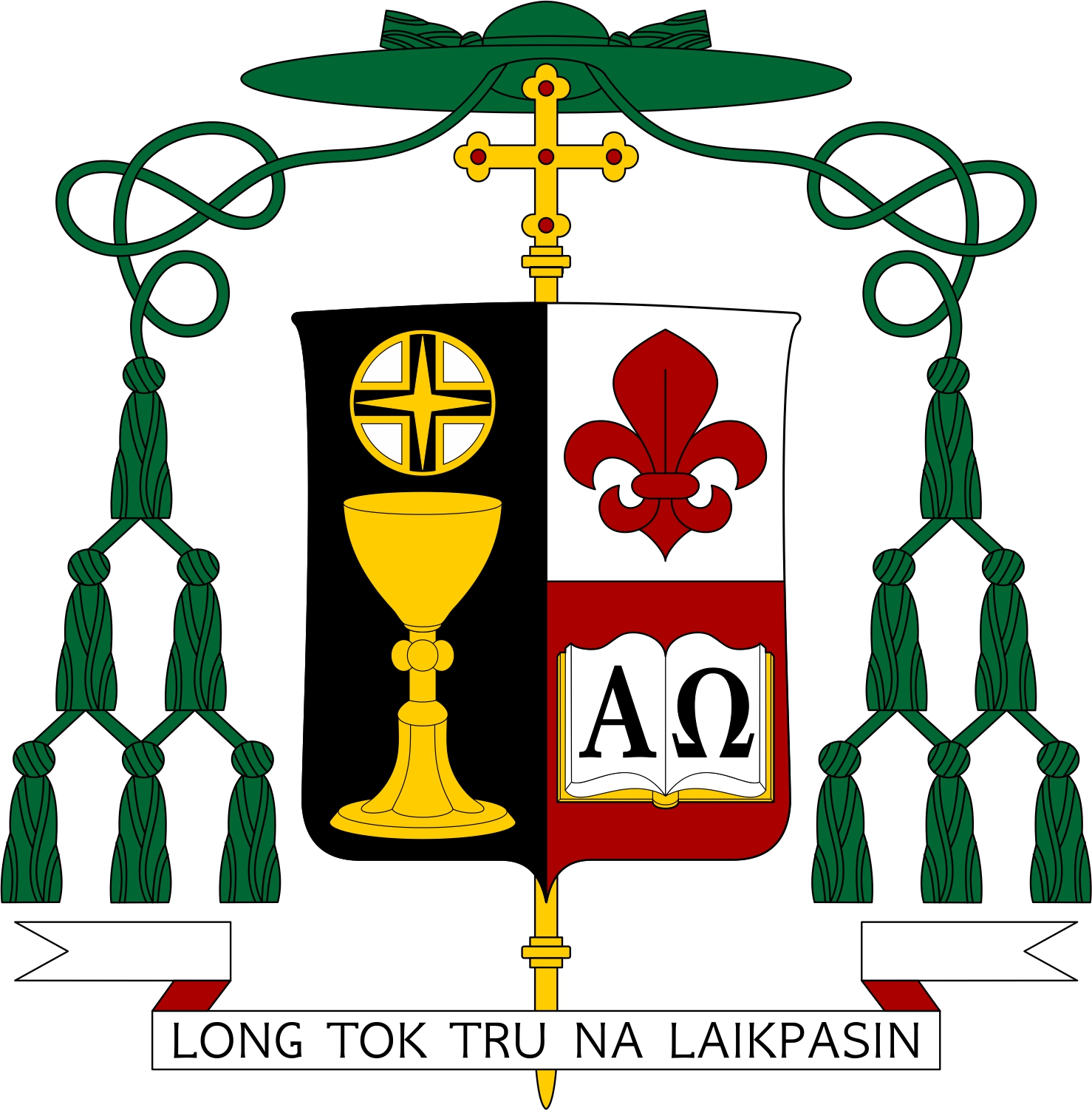
Dariusz Kałuża MSF – coat of arms

== Bishops ==
=== Ordinaries ===
- Bernard Schilling, S.V.D. (1959–1966)
- John Edward Cohill, S.V.D. (1966–1980)
- Raymond Rodly Caesar, S.V.D. (1980–1987)
- Michael Marai (1988–1994)
- Francesco Sarego, S.V.D. (1995–2016) - presently Bishop Emeritus
- Dariusz Kałuża, M.S.F. (2016–2020)
- Walenty Gryk, S.V.D. (2022–present)

=== Coadjutor bishop ===
- Raymond Rodly Caesar, S.V.D. (1978-1980)

== External links and references ==
- "Diocese of Goroka". Catholic-Hierarchy.
