= Diocese of Wewak =

Latin Catholic diocese in Papua New Guinea

Coordinates: 3.5745°S 143.6358°E

Diocese of Wewak Dioecesis Ueuakensis

Location
- Country: Papua New Guinea
- Metropolitan: Archdiocese of Madang
- Headquarters: Wewak, East Sepik Province, Papua New Guinea

Statistics
- Area: 36,917 km^{2} (14,254 sq mi)
- Population: Total; Catholics: (as of 2023); 502,000; 241,000 (48.0%)
- Parishes: 48

Information
- Denomination: Catholic Church
- Sui iuris church: Latin Church
- Rite: Roman Rite
- Established: 25 July 1913; 113 years ago
- Cathedral: Christ the King Cathedral in Wewak
- Secular priests: 31 (21 Diocesan, 10 Religious Orders)

Current leadership
- Pope: Leo XIV
- Bishop: Józef Roszyński, S.V.D.
- Metropolitan Archbishop: Anton Bal

The Diocese of Wewak is a Latin Catholic suffragan diocese of the Archdiocese of Madang. It was elevated to a diocese in 1966.

== History ==
- 25 July 1913: Apostolic Prefecture of Western Kaiser Wilhelms Land is split from the existing Apostolic Prefecture of Kaiser Wilhelms Land
- 14 November 1922: Renamed to Apostolic Prefecture of Central New Guinea
- 27 April 1927 & 15 April 1931: Territory is gained from the Apostolic Prefecture of Eastern New Guinea
- 22 August 1931: Prefecture is elevated, now becoming the Apostolic Vicariate of Central New Guinea
- 15 May 1952: Renamed to Apostolic Vicariate of Wewak, some territory is lost and becomes part of the newly established Apostolic Prefecture of Aitape
- 15 May 1959: Slight boundary reshuffling between here and the Apostolic Vicariate of Aitape
- 18 June 1959: Territory is lost upon the establishment of the Apostolic Vicariate of Mount Hagen
- 15 November 1966: Vicariate is elevated, now becoming the Diocese of Wewak

== Leadership ==
=== Prefects of Western Kaiser Wilhelms Land ===
- Camisio Teodoro Gellings, SS.CC. (19 August 1913 − 1918), resigned
- Adalberto Ottone Rielander, SS.CC.(7 April 1914 − 1922), resigned

=== Prefects of Central New Guinea ===
- Teodosio Heikenrath (1922 − 1923), resigned
- Josef Lörks, S.V.D. (19 June 1928 − 22 August 1931)
  - Apostolic Administrator Josef Lörks, S.V.D. (22 August 1931 − 23 May 1933 see below)

=== Apostolic Vicars of Central New Guinea ===
- Josef Lörks, S.V.D. (see above 23 May 1933 − 17 March 1945)
- Leo Arkfeld, S.V.D. (8 July 1948 − 15 May 1952 see below)

=== Apostolic Vicar of Wewak ===
- Leo Arkfeld, S.V.D. (see above 15 May 1952 − 15 November 1966 see below)

=== Bishops of Wewak ===
- Leo Arkfeld, S.V.D. (see above 15 November 1966 − 19 December 1975), ceased
  - Apostolic Administrator Leo Arkfeld, S.V.D. (19 December 1975 − 15 August 1987)
- Raymond Kalisz, S.V.D. (24 April 1980 − 14 August 2002), retired
- Anthony Joseph Burgess (14 August 2002 − 20 September 2013), retired
- Józef Roszyński, S.V.D. (6 February 2015 – Present)

=== Coadjutor bishop ===
- Anthony Joseph Burgess (2000-2002), succeeded

=== Other priests of this diocese who became bishops ===
- Michael Marai (1976-1988), appointed Bishop of Goroka in 1988
- Cherubim Dambui (1974-2000), appointed Auxiliary Bishop of Port Moresby in 2000
- Otto Separy (1991-2007), appointed Auxiliary Bishop of Aitape in 2007

== See also ==
- Catholic Church in Oceania

== External links and references ==
- "Diocese of Wewak". Catholic-Hierarchy.
