= Józef Roszyński =

Polish Roman Catholic bishop

- Bishop of Wewak
- Church: Latin Church
- Installed: 6 February 2015
- Predecessor: Anthony Joseph Burgess

Orders
- Ordination: 30 April 1989 by Damian Zimoń
- Consecration: 25 April 2015 by Michael Banach

Personal details
- Born: 18 August 1962 (age 62); Nidzica, Polish People's Republic
- Coat of arms

Józef Roszyński (born August 18, 1962 in Nidzica) is a Polish clergyman and bishop for the Roman Catholic Diocese of Wewak. He was appointed bishop in 2015.

== See also ==
- Catholic Church in Oceania
