= Douglas William Young =

Australian Catholic bishop

The Most Reverend Douglas William Young
- Archbishop Emeritus of Mount Hagen
- Church: Catholic Church
- Archdiocese: Mount Hagen
- Appointed: 17 July 2006
- Installed: 17 July 2006
- Term ended: 18 March 2025
- Predecessor: Michael Meier
- Successor: Clement Papa
- Previous posts: Titular Bishop of Rusubbicari (2000‍–‍2006); Auxiliary bishop of the Archdiocese of Mount Hagen (2000‍–‍2006)

Orders
- Ordination: 13 August 1977
- Consecration: 2 July 2000 by Michael Meier

Personal details
- Born: Douglas William Young; 23 January 1950 (age 76) Brisbane, Australia
- Motto: To live faithfully

Styles of Douglas William Young
- Reference style: The Most Reverend
- Spoken style: Your Excellency
- Religious style: Archbishop

Douglas William Young (born 23 January 1950) is an Australian Catholic bishop who is the archbishop emeritus of Mount Hagen. Since ordination, he has served entirely in Papua New Guinea.

== Early life ==
Young was born in Brisbane but grew up in Western Sydney. He attended Parramatta Marist High School and completed his Higher School Certificate in 1968.

== Priesthood ==
Young entered the Society of the Divine Word in 1969 and professed his first vows on 29 November 1970. He studied philosophy in Sydney and was then sent for an internship in Papua New Guinea. He studied theology in London and made his final profession on 29 November 1976. Upon returning to Australia, he was ordained a priest on 13 August 1977, and was immediately assigned to Papua New Guinea.

== Episcopate ==
On 14 April 2000, Pope John Paul II appointed him auxiliary bishop of the Archdiocese of Mount Hagen. He was ordained a bishop on 2 July 2000 at John Paul II Oval, Mount Hagen by Archbishop Michael Meier SVD.

On 17 July 2006, he was appointed Archbishop of Mount Hagen following the retirement of Archbishop Michael Meier SVD.

He submitted his resignation and it was accepted on 18 March 2025 upon reaching the age of 75. Upon retiring, he said he would take some time to travel overseas before returning to Papua New Guinea.

Catholic Church titles
Preceded by Victor León Esteban San Miguel y Erce	— TITULAR — Titular Bishop of Rusubbicari; 2000–2006	Succeeded by Sergio Osvaldo Buenanueva
Preceded by Michael Meier	Archbishop of Mount Hagen; 2006–2025	Succeeded by Clement Papa
