= Raymond Kalisz =

American Catholic bishop (1927–2010)

Raymond Philip Kalisz
- Bishop Emeritus of Wewak
- Church: Catholic Church
- Diocese: Diocese of Wewak
- See: Wewak
- Elected: 24 April 1980 (as Bishop)
- In office: 1980–2002 (Bishop of Wewak)
- Retired: 14 August 2002

Orders
- Ordination: 15 August 1954
- Consecration: 15 August 1980
- Rank: Bishop

Personal details
- Born: Raymond Philip Kalisz; September 27, 1927 Melvindale, Michigan, U.S.
- Died: December 12, 2010 (aged 83) Evanston, Illinois, U.S.
- Buried: St. Mary Cemetery, Techny, Illinois
- Denomination: Catholicism

Raymond Philip Kalisz (27 September 1927 – 12 December 2010) was the Catholic bishop of the Diocese of Wewak, Papua New Guinea.

Born in Melvindale, Michigan, United States, Kalisz was ordained a priest on 15 August 1954 for the Society of the Divine Word. On 24 April 1980, Kalisz was appointed bishop of the Wewak Diocese and was ordained on 15 August 1980.

Between 1996 and 1999, he was the President of the Catholic Bishops Conference of Papua New Guinea and Solomon Islands.

Bishop Kalisz retired on 14 August 2002. He died on Sunday 12 December 2010, in Evanston, Illinois, at the age of 83. Cardinal Francis Eugene George, OMI, Metropolitan Archbishop of Chicago, Illinois, presided at an evening wake service Thursday 16 December 2010, and Father Adam MacDonald was the main celebrant of the Bishop's funeral Mass on Friday 17 December 2010. Both services took place in the Chapel of the Holy Spirit, at the Techny Towers Conference and Retreat Center in Techny, Illinois; burial at St. Mary Cemetery in Techny followed the funeral Mass.
