= Diocese of Mendi =

Latin Catholic diocese in Papua New Guinea

Coordinates: 6.1508°S 143.6610°E

Diocese of Mendi Dioecesis Mendiensis

Location
- Country: Papua New Guinea
- Metropolitan: Archdiocese of Mount Hagen

Statistics
- Area: 19,000 km^{2} (7,300 sq mi)
- Population: Total; Catholics: (as of 2004); 546,400; 71,832 (13.1%)

Information
- Denomination: Catholic Church
- Sui iuris church: Latin Church
- Rite: Roman Rite

Current leadership
- Pope: Leo XIV
- Bishop: Donald Francis Lippert OFMCap

The Diocese of Mendi is a Latin Catholic suffragan diocese of the Archdiocese of Mount Hagen, in Mendi, Papua New Guinea. It was erected Prefecture Apostolic in 1958 and elevated Vicariate Apostolic in 1965. It was elevated, along with other Oceanic vicariates and prefectures, to a diocese on 15 November 1966. The bishop is Donald Lippert, OFMCap.

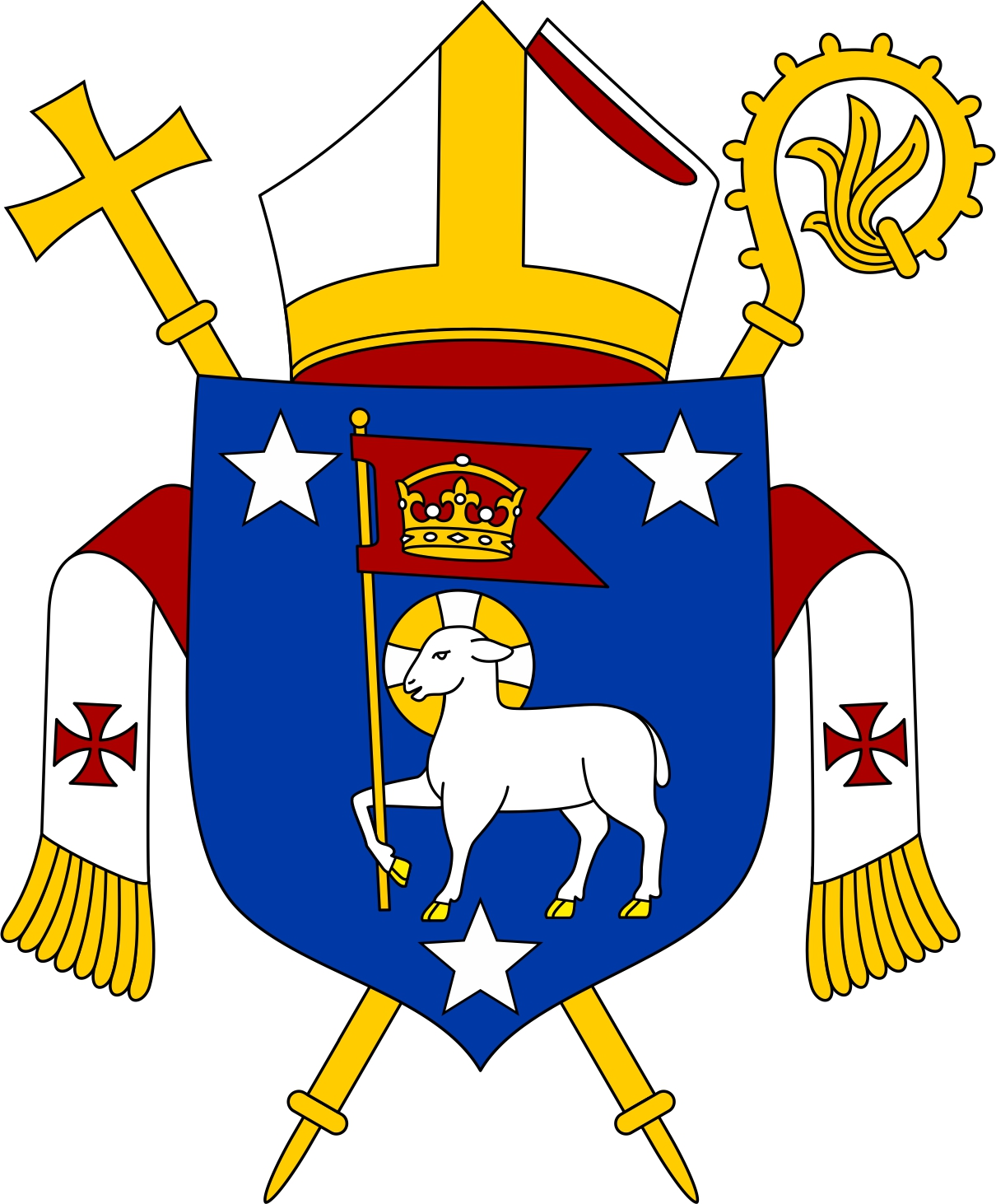
Coat of arms

== History ==
A Short History of the Mendi Mission

The Catholic Church in the Southern Highlands of Papua New Guinea celebrated its Golden Jubilee tin 2004. The first missionaries, Fr. Alexis Michellod MSC and his stalwart companion Br. Jean Delabarre MSC, arrived in Mendi on September 9, 1954, and celebrated the first Mass in the province the next day. Fr. Alexis, a gregarious and friendly man of many talents and deep faith, was so moved by the Gospel reading of the Mass of the day, that he never grew tired of repeating it: "At that time Jesus said to his disciples, 'Fear not little flock, for it has pleased your Father to give you the kingdom (Luke 12:32). " This quotation proved to be prophetic for it continues to describe the joy, faith and great enthusiasm with which the people of the Southern Highlands have accepted the Good News of Jesus Christ into their lives. Fr. Alexis will be forever known as the" Apostle to the Southern Highlands". Today, at ninety years of age, he lives in France with his MSC community, resting from his many years of mission work in PNG.

In the Beginning

For centuries the Southern Highlands, or Central Highlands as the area was once called, remained totally isolated, unknown by the outside world. It is believed that the original people in these rugged mountains were pushed to the region by hostile coastal tribes some 10,000 years ago. Accustomed to fighting in the maze of deep valleys and rushing rivers for centuries, the tribes of the Southern Highlands became territorially confined. Cut off from the outside world, and to a great extent from each other as well, the various tribes developed distinct languages and as with the people of the other highlands provinces accurate human history extended back only as far as living memory could recall, at which point it disappeared into the fog of rich mythology.

Australian Mick Leahy, a gold prospector and one of the first expatriates to enter the highlands, described the region appropriately, "The Land that Time Forgot". Jack Hides, Australian government patrol officer and explorer, would refer to it as the "Papuan Wonderland", the title of his book about official patrols he led into the heart of this dangerous and uncharted territory in the 1930s. The Southern Highlands is the last area of the highlands to welcome the dawn of recorded history. But now, in just half a century, it has progressed from a Stone Age existence to the Space and Computer Age.

World War II put an end to exploration of the Southern Highlands as the Australian colonial government hunkered down to meet the threat of the Japanese invasion. The highlands local people were mostly unaffected by the war although they wondered about the large noisy birds that flew overhead on many days in perfect formation, from south to north and back again. One language group dubbed these strange creatures mu-engi, literally "mother" of the sound "muuuu". Years later patrol officers would show the people how to clear and level ground to build fields on which the iron and cloth birds would land.

After the war Australian "kiaps" (government patrol officers) re-opened the government post at beautiful Lake Kutubu, which was at the time the doorway into the Southern Highlands. During the same year, 1949, Patrol Officers Sid Smith and Desmond Clancy entered the Mendi Valley. Smith moved on toward Ialibu while Clancy remained to open the Mendi station in September 1950. An airstrip was quickly constructed and the first p1ane landed in October. A year later Smith and Clancy, now Joined by Ron Neville, made a patrol back through Kutubu and on to the Tari Basin. Tari government post was established in July 1951.

The Arrival of the Missionaries

Christian missionaries soon arrived in the Southern Highlands, the first being Rev. Gordon Young of the Methodist Overseas Missions, later known as the United Church of Papua New Guinea. Rev.Young established a camp at Mendi in 1950. Other Christian missionaries built stations at Orakana and on the shore of Lake Kutubu in 1951. For the Catholic Church the Southern Highlands was designated as part of the Fly River mission, which included just about all the territory from the Papuan coast to the western border of the Territory of Papua and New Guinea right up into the mountains of the Southern Highlands.

Fr. Alexis MichellodMSC and Br. Jean Delabarre MSC

At first it was believed that only about 30,000 people lived in the high blue mountains of central and northern Papua but soon it became apparent that reports about large populations hidden in lush mountain valleys were true. Some said as many as 250,000 people inhabited the region. At this point Catholic Church officials became very interested in exploring the area. Fr. Alexis Michellod MSC with Br. Jean Delabarre MSC were sent on this exploratory mission. Bishop Andre Sorin, headquartered on Yule Island, and the French MSC superior regular Fr. Pierre Guichet MSC, his vicar, are credited with taking the initial step of sending the missionaries to investigate this little known mountain region of the Port Moresby vicariate.

While this was going on, a very energetic Archbishop Romolo Carboni, new apostolic delegate to Australia, New Zealand and the Pacific Islands, had set out on his own mission to find religious congregations willing to provide missionaries for the Mendi mission and the many other territories that need them. Missionaries of the Sacred Heart, Society of the Divine Word, Marist and Franciscan Friars were already in place. By the time Archbishop Carboni left office a few years later the Passionists, Marianhill Fathers, Montforts, Capuchins and Dominicans had been added to the list.

Capuchins from the St. Augustine Province of Pennsylvania in the USA accepted the Mendi Mission two weeks after receiving a formal request from Rome to do so. This news reached Yule Island shortly before Fr. Michellod and Br. Delabarre were about to conclude their two-month exploratory mission in the Southern Highlands. Preparing to fly from Tari, the second government centre he had visited while in the Southern Highlands, and return to Mendi on his way back to Port Moresby, Fr. Michellod received a short message from his superior that would determine his fate for the next two years. "Stay.", came the order from Fr. Guichet, "Start foundation of Southern Highlands. Helpers coming soon."

Br. Delabarre returned to Yule Island and Fr. Alphonse Rinn MSC, who opened the Ialibu mission, the third of the three original stations, joined Fr. Michellod. Shortly thereafter three Mekeo lay missionaries arrived, Ferdinand Maino Kap, Louis Vangu'u and Peter Peleka. Fr. Alexis put them to work teaching in a little school he had begun at Kumin. Fr. Rinn brought Br. Paul Idomaka and Br. Felix Walaba of the Oblates of St. Joseph, a local Papuan religious congregation also known as "Little Brothers", to help him lay the foundation for the Catholic Church in Ialibu. Another MSC priest, Fr. Louis Van Campenhoudt, 66 years of age, joined his confreres in 1955 and settled in Mendi allowing Fr. Rinn to move permanently to Ialibu. The missionaries were greatly encouraged by the welcome they received from the people of Mendi, Tari and Ialibu. The work of evangelization began. At the same time landowners provided plots of land for the missionaries to build their homes, make a garden, set up a school and construct the church. People brought food and firewood and there was no lack of curious and friendly youths to help dig the drains, build the houses and clear the bush. Fr. Alexis' Swissstyle two-storey bush houses, constructed without a single steel nail (he drilled holes and fastened the framework timbers with wooden pegs) were the wonder of both Mendi and Tari. Such houses had never been seen before.

The Capuchins Arrive

Finally, on November 23, 1955, the first of the Capuchin missionaries, Fr. Otmar Gallagher OFM Cap., arrived in Tari to join Fr. Alexis. Fr. Otmar, with his deep, strong voice, outwardly stern nature and kind heart, was the leader of the new Capuchin missionaries. He had previous mission experience in Puerto Rico. Two days later Fr. Berard Tomassetti OFM Cap. arrived. Fr. Berard was a tall, thin scholarly looking man, an engineer who had served in the American navy during the Pacific war. The friars called him "Chief'. An untiring evangelist, Fr. Berard later would also survey roads, build bridges and set up hydro-electric plants. Then followed Fr. Stanley Miltenberger OFM Cap., another priest with missionary experience in Puerto Rico. He trained as a pilot in preparation for coming to the Mendi mission. A week later the youngest of the Capuchin group, Br. Mark Bollinger OFM Cap. set foot on Huli land. Br. Mark, carpenter and mechanic, jack-of-all-trades, was known for his good humour. Happy or sad, angry, worried, calm, tired, anxious or relaxed, his reaction was almost always the same, a little laugh and a joking word. Fr. Henry Kusnerik OFM Cap. came on the next flight to Tari. He was the oldest of the group, a dedicated priest doing mission work in Australia, a perfectionist who worried about many things. Fr. Paul Farkas OFM Cap., who had taken ill on arrival by ship in Samarai and nearly died, was the last to arrive. He was the comic of the group. A short and stocky individual, Fr. Paul was loved by all, especially the children who delighted is his antics and jokes. Later his Huli greeting "mambo bayale" (good brother) delivered with great gusto became the trademark by which he was known in all the places he was assigned. By December 22, 1955, the Capuchin friars were together again at Tari after the long trip from the States and installed in the twostorey bush-chalet built by Fr. Alexis. They named their new home St. Francis Friary, the first motherhouse of the Southern Highlands Capuchins.

During the following months the MSC and Capuchin missionaries worked together, preaching the Good News, building up the mainstations, opening schools. As prohibited areas were derestricted and missionaries set out from the centres to establish sub-stations in new villages. They went on long and difficult foot patrols, often two-by-two, days and weeks at a time as the experienced MSC missionaries taught their Capuchin brothers the tricks-of-the-trade. Through all this they felt the grace of God blessing their ministry as the people of the Southern Highlands embraced the Good News of Jesus with enthusiasm. When finally the founding MSC priests departed a year later the Mendi mission became known as the Capuchin Mission, until the Diocese of Mendi was established on November 15, 1966. In 1959, Fr. Firmin Schmidt OFM Cap. a professor of theology at Capuchin College in Washington DC, was appointed the first ecclesiastical superior of the Capuchin Mission in the Southern Highlands. He was ordained a bishop on December 15, 1965, and became the first Ordinary of the Diocese of Mendi in 1966. A physically strong man from a Kansas farm family, Bishop Firmin, a Doctor of Theology with a great devotion to the Blessed Mother, did not volunteer for the missions. Rather, he generously and joyfully accepted the call to lead the Church in the Southern Highlands, and gave his life to that task for 36 years. Now late into his eighties and with failing health, Bishop Firmin lives in a retirement home near the Capuchin friary in Victoria, Kansas.

They Planted the Good News and Helped it Grow

The Catholic Church would not have taken root in the Southern Highlands had not the Spirit of God prepared the people of this land to accept the Gospel of Christ so readily into their lives. Today hundreds of Southern Highlanders serve the Church as lay ministers of various kinds, catechists, prayer leaders, ministers to the sick and so on. These people are too numerous to name. The Catholic Church has grown and is healthy. More than 100,000 people have been baptized since 1960 when the fIrst baptisms took place. Today there are about 75,000 Catholics spread over 31 parishes and pastoral areas in the Diocese. There are nearly 350 Catholic communities in the province.

Several Southern Highlanders have become priests or religious, the first being Fr. Simon Apea, a diocesan priest, and Br. Peter Warea, a Capuchin brother celebrating his silver jubilee this year. There are numerous young men who are presently discerning God's call to the priesthood and religious life and are in the seminary or other formation programs. The Diocese of Mendi has its own diocesan congregation of sisters, the Franciscan Sisters of Mary. Sr. Pat Puame and Sr. Elizabeth Epei are the seniors of this growing community, and they too celebrate their 25th year during our Golden Jubilee.

For many years the Capuchins provided nearly all the missionary priests and brothers for the mission. However, there were always a few diocesan priests, mostly from Australia, but also from New Zealand and America who came to preach the Gospel in the Southern Highlands too. More recently other religious congregations have come, the Heralds of Good News, Missionaries of the Holy Family, Missionaries of God's Love, a Carmelite and Korean Mission Society priests. Diocesan priests from Poland are now working in the diocese as well. Today there are many missionary and local sisters serving the Church in the Southern Highlands. The list of sisters who have worked in the Diocese in the past numbers in the hundreds. The first sisters arrived in 1960, four members of the Order of St. Francis of Oldenburg, Indiana USA. They were Sr. Noreen McLaughlin Sr. Annata (Kate) Holohan Sr. Matrine Mayborg and Sr. Claver Ehren. Sr. Martine is the only one of this group who still remains in PNG. She runs the adult literacy program of the Mendi Diocese. Religious sisters from many congregations have served in the diocese, Swiss Sisters of Baldegg, Our Lady of the Missions, Sisters of Charity of Jesus and Mary, Handmaids of the Lord, Marist Sisters, Missionaries of Charity, Daughters of Mary Immaculate, Missionaries of the Sacred Heart, Franciscan Clarist Congregation, Korean Foreign Mission Sisters and our own Franciscan Sisters of Mary. All have served with great faith, compassion and commitment as teachers, nurses or pastoral workers.

Since the early days of the Catholic Church in the Southern Highlands dozens of lay missionary helpers from different countries have contributed to the establishment and growth of the Church in the Diocese of Mendi. The first lay missionaries in a long list of overseas lay helpers were Fidelis Miltenberger and his wife Josephine. Newly married the couple arrived in 1956 and worked for several years in the mission. Fidelis was a pilot and the brother of Fr. Stanley. Lay missionaries, serving as teachers, health care providers, pilots, mechanics, carpenters, electricians and pastoral workers have given invaluable service to the Church in the Diocese of Mendi.

Thousands of friends and benefactors from all over the world have contributed spiritually and materially to the evangelization of the Southern Highlands. Foremost among these are the people who support the Seraphic Mass Association (SMA) or Capuchin Mission Office, established decades ago by the Capuchins of the Pennsylvania Province to offer generous friends the opportunity to share in the establishment and growth of the Catholic Church in the Southern Highlands. Fr. Cecil Nally OFM Cap. began this work and was later joined by his brother Fr. Don Nally OFM Cap. Today the Capuchin Mission Office, with its staff of dedicated lay men and women under the direction of Fr. Francis Fugini OFM Cap., continues to provide the Diocese of Mendi with its main financial support. Many individuals and parish groups in America and other countries pray for the Mendi mission and donate money to continue the work of evangelization and social ministry even today. These people will surly be blessed for their generosity.

During our Golden Jubilee Year, we are embarking on a year of pastoral renewal in the Mendi Diocese. Basing our renewal on the vision, mission and priorities of the Church in PNG as enunciated by the General Assembly of the Catholic Church in Papua New Guinea and endorsed by the Catholic Bishops of PNG we the Catholic people of the Southern Highlands, in Union with all the Catholic people of this country, wish to proclaim, "We, the Catholic Church in Papua New Guinea, are alive in Christ, witnessing the love of God in the world." Please pray for us during our jubilee year.

Bishop Stephen Reichert OFM Cap.

Bishop of Mendi

MARSEILLE, France April 2010 - Father Alexis Michellod MSC died on April 24. He is from the French Province. He was born at Leytron, le Valais Suisse (Diocese of Sion) on June 30, 1914. He made his first profession on September 29, 1933. He was ordained priest on July 7, 1940. His funeral was on April 26 at 10h AM in Marseille, France.

== Bishops ==
- Firmin Martin Schmidt, OFMCap (1959–1995)
- Stephen Joseph Reichert, OFMCap (1995–2010), appointed Archbishop of Madang
- Donald Francis Lippert, OFMCap (2012–current)

== Parishes ==
Mendi, Ialibu, Imbongu, Muli and 12 others.

== External links and references ==
- "Diocese of Mendi". Catholic-Hierarchy.
- "A Short History of the Mendi Mission". Catholic Diocese of Mendi.
