= Diocese of Kundiawa =

Latin Catholic diocese in Papua New Guinea

Coordinates: 6.0209°S 144.9697°E

Diocese of Kundiawa Dioecesis Kundiavana
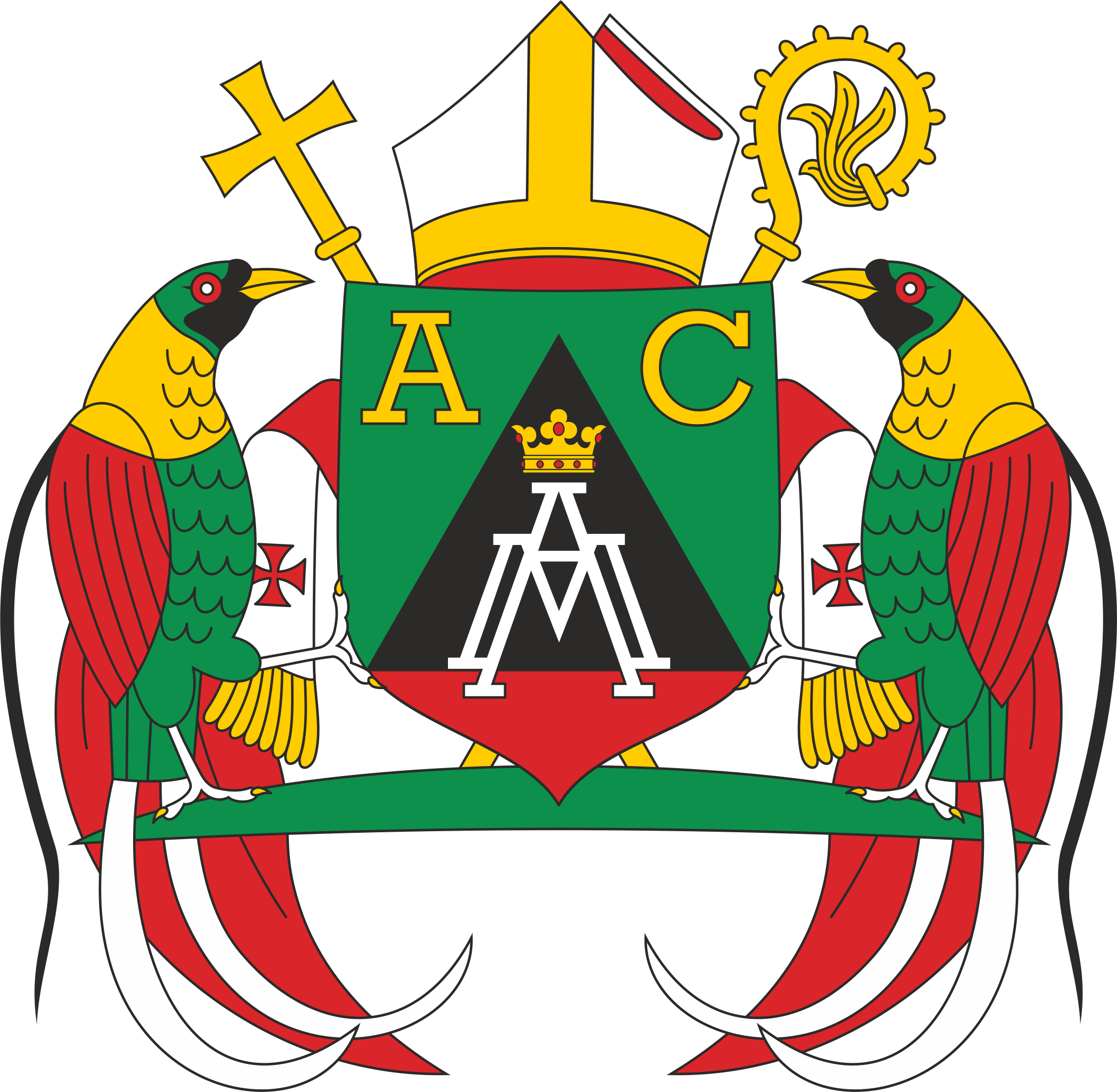
- Coat of arms

Location
- Country: Papua New Guinea
- Ecclesiastical region: Archdiocese of Mount Hagen
- Headquarters: Kundiawa

Statistics
- Area: 6,112 km^{2} (2,360 sq mi)
- Population: Total; Catholics: (as of 2023); 291,485; 75,930 (26%)
- Parishes: 23

Information
- Denomination: Catholic Church
- Sui iuris church: Latin Church
- Rite: Roman Rite
- Established: 8 June 1982; 43 years ago

Current leadership
- Pope: Leo XIV
- Bishop: Paul Sundu
- Metropolitan Archbishop: Clement Papa
- Bishops emeritus: Johannes Henricus J. Te Maarssen, S.V.D.

The Diocese of Kundiawa is a Latin Catholic suffragan diocese of the Archdiocese of Mount Hagen in Papua New Guinea. It was erected in 1982, having been separated from the Diocese of Goroka.

== Bishops ==
=== Ordinaries ===
- William Joseph Kurtz, S.V.D. (1982–1999), appointed Coadjutor Archbishop of Madang
- Johannes Henricus J. Te Maarssen, S.V.D. (2000–2009)
- Anton Bal (2009–2019), appointed Archbishop of Madang
- Paul Sundu (2021–present)

=== Auxiliary bishop ===
- Anton Bal (2007–2009), appointed Bishop here

== External links and references ==
- "Diocese of Kundiawa". Catholic-Hierarchy.
