= Michael Meier =

German Roman Catholic prelate (1928–2022)

His Excellency Michael Meier
- Archbishop of Mount Hagen
- Diocese: Mount Hagen
- Installed: 7 March 1987
- Term ended: 17 July 2006
- Predecessor: George Elmer Bernarding
- Successor: Douglas William Young
- Previous post: Coadjutor Archbishop of Mount Hagen (1984–1987)

Orders
- Ordination: 30 May 1957
- Consecration: 15 August 1984 by George Elmer Bernarding

Personal details
- Born: 19 October 1928 Wolfshausen, Hesse-Nassau, Prussia, Germany
- Died: 3 April 2022 (aged 93) Sankt Wendel, Saarland, Germany

Michael Meier (19 October 1928 – 3 April 2022) was a German Roman Catholic prelate.

Meier was born in Germany and was ordained to the priesthood in 1957. He served as coadjutor archbishop of the Roman Catholic Archdiocese of Mount Hagen, Papua New Guinea from 1984 to 1987 and as archbishop of the Mount Hagen Archdiocese from 1987 until his retirement in 2006.

Catholic Church titles
Preceded by George Elmer Bernarding	Archbishop of Mount Hagen; 1987–2006	Succeeded by Douglas William Young
