= Tamalluma =

Former Roman city and Latin Catholic titular bishopric

Africa Proconsularis (125 AD)

Tamalluma is a former Roman city which remains a Latin Catholic titular bishopric.

== History ==
The city was at Telmin, an oasis in present Tunisia, one of many in the Roman province of Byzacena, which were suffragan of the Metropolitan Archbishopric Hadrumetum (Sousse), but faded.

== Titular see ==
The diocese was nominally restored in 1933 as a titular bishopric, of the (lowest) episcopal) rank, with a single incumbent of Archiepiscopal rank.

== Known Bishops ==
- Habetdeus (Catholic bishop mentioned in 484)
- Antonio † (mentioned in 484) (Arian bishop)
- Titular Archbishop George Joseph Biskup (1967.07.20 – 1970.01.03) as Coadjutor Archbishop of Indianapolis (USA) (1967.07.20 – 1970.01.03), later succeeding as Metropolitan Archbishop of Indianapolis (1970.01.03 – death 1979.03.20); previously Titular Bishop of Hemeria (1957.03.09 – 1965.01.30) as Auxiliary Bishop of Dubuque (USA) (1957.03.09 – 1965.01.30), then Bishop of Des Moines (USA) (1965.01.30 – 1967.07.20)
- Francis Joseph Walmsley (1979.01.08 – 1998.03.07), last Military Vicar (1979.01.08 – 1986.07.21) and first Military Ordinary (1986.07.21 – 2002.05.24) of the Bishopric of the Forces in Great Britain
- António José Cavaco Carrilho Carrilho (1999.02.22 – 2007.03.08) as Auxiliary Bishop of (O)Porto (Portugal) (1999.02.22 – 2007.03.08); later Bishop of Funchal (Portugal) (2007.03.08 – ...)
- Anton Bal (2007.06.05 – 2009.01.12) as Auxiliary Bishop of Kundiawa (Papua New Guinea) (2007.06.05 – 2009.01.12), later succeeded as Bishop of Kundiawa (2009.01.12 – 2019.07.26) and as Archbishop of Madang (2019.07.26 – ...)
- Samuel Irenios Kattukallil (2010.01.25 – ...), Auxiliary Bishop of Trivandrum of the Syro-Malankars (India, Eastern Catholic of Antiochian Rite)

== External links and sources ==
- GCatholic

Specific
