= Conana =

Town of ancient Pisidia

Coordinates: 37°57′22″N 30°30′54″E

Conana or Konana (Ancient Greek: Κόνανα) was an inland town of ancient Pisidia inhabited during Hellenistic, Roman, and Byzantine times. The town may also have been called Justinianopolis or Ioustinianoupolis (Ἰουστινιανούπολις). The town was a bishopric in early days of Christianity; no longer the seat of a residential bishop, it remains a titular see of the Roman Catholic Church.

Its site is located near Gönen, in Asiatic Turkey.
