= Kundiawa =

- Location within Papua New Guinea
- Coordinates: 6°01′S 144°58′E
- Country: Papua New Guinea
- Province: Simbu Province
- District: Kundiawa-Gembogl District
- LLG: Kundiawa Urban
- Elevation: 1,524 m (5,000 ft)

Population (2013)
  - Total: 11,553

Languages
  - Main languages: Kuman, Tok Pisin, English, Dom, Sinasina
- Time zone: UTC+10 (AEST)
- Postcode: 461
- Location: 85 km (53 mi) E of Mount Hagen
- Climate: Af

Kundiawa is the capital of Simbu Province, Papua New Guinea, with a population of 8,147 (2000 Census). It lies along the Highlands Highway approximately halfway between Goroka and Mount Hagen, respectively the capitals of the Eastern Highlands and Western Highlands provinces.

Kundiawa is the centre of activity for people who are formally employed (which is a relatively small minority, because most people farm) but also for people who want to sell the coffee that they have grown, or to catch PMVs (public motor vehicles) to other towns. The busiest time in Kundiawa is every other Friday afternoon, because this is when everyone gets paid.

== Geography ==
It is a relatively small town, containing a bank, a police station, one of the few airports in the province, several stores, a hospital, a post office, a second-hand market, two food markets and several churches. The Highlands Highway is the only paved road that leads out of it, but there are several smaller, unpaved roads, including one of the roads to Mount Wilhelm.

The Wahgi River runs along one side of Kundiawa, and the Simbu River, which runs on and becomes the Wahgi, flows along the other side. The terrain around Kundiawa is very steep and mountainous, and many people walk several kilometres each way to get to Kundiawa from their villages because they don't have access to roads.

== Climate ==
Kundiawa has a relatively cool tropical rainforest climate (Köppen Af), bordering on a subtropical highland climate (Cfb) due to altitude. It features mild mornings, very warm but not hot afternoons, and heavy rainfall year round.

Climate data for Kundiawa
Month	Jan	Feb	Mar	Apr	May	Jun	Jul	Aug	Sep	Oct	Nov	Dec	Year
Mean daily maximum °C (°F)	26.1 (79.0)	26.4 (79.5)	25.7 (78.3)	26.0 (78.8)	25.8 (78.4)	25.4 (77.7)	24.7 (76.5)	25.3 (77.5)	25.5 (77.9)	25.7 (78.3)	26.5 (79.7)	25.9 (78.6)	25.8 (78.4)
Daily mean °C (°F)	20.5 (68.9)	20.7 (69.3)	20.2 (68.4)	20.3 (68.5)	20.2 (68.4)	19.5 (67.1)	19.0 (66.2)	19.4 (66.9)	19.6 (67.3)	19.0 (66.2)	20.0 (68.0)	20.3 (68.5)	19.9 (67.8)
Mean daily minimum °C (°F)	14.9 (58.8)	15.0 (59.0)	14.8 (58.6)	14.6 (58.3)	14.7 (58.5)	13.7 (56.7)	13.4 (56.1)	13.5 (56.3)	13.8 (56.8)	14.1 (57.4)	13.6 (56.5)	14.8 (58.6)	14.2 (57.6)
Average rainfall mm (inches)	237 (9.3)	239 (9.4)	274 (10.8)	229 (9.0)	180 (7.1)	102 (4.0)	93 (3.7)	115 (4.5)	179 (7.0)	194 (7.6)	193 (7.6)	230 (9.1)	2,265 (89.1)

== Economy ==
The rugged terrain prevent people from having an elaborate commercial agriculture. However, they are known for their skilled cultivation on these very steep, sloping terrains. Their main foods are sweet potato, taro, banana, and sugar cane. Coffee is the main cash crop.

== Languages ==
There are different ethnic-linguistic groups, Dom, Bomai, Golin and Kuman. The most spoken language is the Kuman with more than 115,000 speakers. Kuman is understood and spoken by almost all the different ethnic groups.

== Notable people ==
Melbourne Storm and Papua New Guinea national rugby league team centre, Justin Olam was born and grew up in Kundiawa.

England wicketkeeper Geraint Jones was born in Kundiawa.
